The Flash is an American television series developed by Greg Berlanti, Andrew Kreisberg, and Geoff Johns, based on the DC Comics character the Flash. The series premiered on The CW television network in the United States on October 7, 2014, and has concluded its eighth season. The series is a spin-off from Arrow, and set in the same fictional universe.

The following is a list of characters who have appeared in the television series. Many of the characters appearing in the series are based on DC Comics characters.

Overview 
Legend
 = Main cast (credited)
 = Recurring cast (4+)
 = Guest cast (1-3)

Main characters

Barry Allen / Flash

Bartholomew Henry "Barry" Allen (portrayed by Grant Gustin; seasons 1–9) is the main protagonist of the series. He is an awkward assistant crime-scene investigator (CSI) for the Central City Police Department (CCPD) who moonlights as the Flash. Barry is traumatized as a child when his mother Nora is murdered by the Reverse-Flash and his father Henry is framed for the crime. Joe West becomes Barry's adoptive father, and Barry tries to discover what happened that night. He first appears in Arrow, personally investigating a superhuman-related crime in Starling City. Barry is a fan of the Arrow's exploits and learns Oliver Queen is the vigilante; they become good friends. Sometime after Barry returns to Central City, he is struck in his laboratory by lightning which was affected by dark matter from the explosion of the S.T.A.R. Lab's particle accelerator. Logan Williams portrays Barry as a child (recurring: season 1; guest: season 2).

Savitar

Savitar (also portrayed by Gustin; performed by Andre Tricoteux and voiced by Tobin Bell in exosuit; recurring: season 3; guest: seasons 5 & 9) is a temporal duplicate of Barry from a possible future who travels back in time and becomes embedded in a bootstrap paradox. He serves as the main antagonist of season three.

Iris West-Allen

Iris Ann West-Allen (portrayed by Candice Patton; seasons 1–9) is a reporter and the daughter of detective Joe West. In season four, she marries Barry, and in later seasons, heads Central City Citizen Media.
 Patton also portrays Iris's Earth-2 doppelgänger, who is married to Barry and has a strained relationship with Joe.
 In the Reverse-Flashpoint timeline, Iris is engaged to Eobard Thawne.

Caitlin Snow

Dr. Caitlin Snow (portrayed by Danielle Panabaker; seasons 1–8) is a bioengineer who works at S.T.A.R. Labs and is the daughter of scientists Thomas Snow and Carla Tannhauser. She was engaged to Ronnie Raymond before the particle accelerator explosion. She temporarily shares her body with an alter-ego named Killer Frost, and "dies" in a failed attempt to resurrect her, enabling a new personality named Khione to take over her body.
 In the Reverse-Flashpoint timeline, Caitlin is dating Marcus Ficus.

Killer Frost / Frost / Hellfrost
Killer Frost (also portrayed by Danielle Panabaker; main: seasons 5–8; recurring: seasons 3–4; guest: seasons 2 & 9) is Caitlin's violent metahuman alter-ego who was inadvertently created by Thomas during his experiments to treat Caitlin's ALS gene. In later seasons, she works alongside Team Flash as just "Frost". When hit by Mirror Monarch's mirror gun, she and Caitlin split into two bodies. Frost briefly transforms into Hellfrost and gives her life in the fight against Deathstorm. An attempt to revive Frost brings out a new dominant personality named Khione.

 Panabaker also portrays Caitlin's and Killer Frost's Earth-2 doppelgänger, a metahuman villainess who is the wife of Deathstorm (Ronnie Raymond of Earth-2) and works for Zoom. She did not finish medical school and became a criminal. After Earth-2's particle accelerator explosion, she developed cryokinesis and became unable to touch anyone without killing them. Her hair turned white and her lips and eyes blue.
 In the Reverse-Flashpoint timeline, Frost is dating Mark Blaine.

Khione / Snow 
Khione (also portrayed by Danielle Panabaker; season 9) is a new personality and a "third Snow sister" in Caitlin's body who emerges from the Consciousness Resurrection Chamber after its malfunction. She briefly uses the alias Snow. Her powers appear to be nature-based, as she was able to heal someone with just a touch and she could sense that Iris was pregnant before even she knew. Due to their being no traces of dark matter or cold fusion energy present in her cells or the presence of only one biometric signature after Chester sent his notes to Carla Tannhauser, she is neither a regular human or a meta-human, making the origin of her powers unknown.

Eddie Thawne

Eddie Thawne (portrayed by Rick Cosnett; main: season 1; guest: seasons 2–3 & 8–9) is a CCPD detective who transferred from Keystone City who is initially romantically involved with Iris. He is an ancestor of Eobard Thawne. In subsequent seasons, he appears when other characters travel to the past, and the Speed Force occasionally uses Eddie's likeness.

Cosnett was originally slated to portray Jay Garrick in the pilot before the character was changed to Eddie Thawne. Many speculated his character to be the Reverse-Flash in disguise, due to his last name and appearance.
 Eddie's name is seen on a list of contacts on a phone at Barry's and Iris's home on Earth-2, implying his doppelgänger's existence.

Cisco Ramon / Vibe / Mecha-Vibe

Francisco Baracus "Cisco" Ramon (portrayed by Carlos Valdes; seasons 1–7) is a mechanical engineering genius who works at S.T.A.R. Labs. Beginning in season two, he operates as the superhero Vibe using metahuman visions and the ability to create breaches to other places. He loses his abilities in season five, but they are temporarily restored during the Crisis. In season seven, he uses technology to mimic his former abilities as Mecha-Vibe and leaves Central City for a job at A.R.G.U.S. with his girlfriend Kamilla Hwang.

 Valdes also portrays Cisco's Earth-2 doppelgänger Reverb, a metahuman villain, enforcer for Zoom and intimidating wrangler of Killer Frost and Deathstorm. He has more experience and control of his powers than his Earth-1 self, and can manipulate sonic vibrations to create powerful shock waves of considerable strength. His visor technology is used to modify Vibe's own visor.
 Valdes also portrays Cisco's Earth-19 doppelgänger Echo, a hacker who murdered Gypsy. Breacher and his fellow Collectors thought that Cisco was responsible, but they eventually discover the true culprit and arrest him.
 In the Reverse-Flashpoint timeline, Cisco was mentioned to have been killed by Damien Darhk and Reverse-Flash.

Eobard Thawne / Reverse-Flash

Eobard Thawne (portrayed by Tom Cavanagh in the form of Harrison Wells; main: seasons 1–6; recurring: season 8; guest: season 7 and by Matt Letscher in his original likeness; guest: seasons 1–3 & 8–9) is a time-traveling criminal, a future descendant of Eddie Thawne, and the archenemy of Barry Allen.

Harrison Wells

Harrison Wells (portrayed by Tom Cavanagh; seasons 1–7) is, on most Earths in the multiverse, the mind and money behind the S.T.A.R. Labs particle accelerator in Central City. He is an original character created for the series.

Joe West

Joseph "Joe" West (portrayed by Jesse L. Martin; main: seasons 1–8; recurring: season 9) is a detective for the CCPD and father of Iris and Wally. He becomes Barry's legal guardian after Nora Allen's death and Henry Allen's incarceration. He dates Cecile, who eventually gives birth to their daughter Jenna.

 Martin also portrays Joe's Earth-2 doppelgänger Joseph West, a lounge singer who does not share a father-son bond with Barry and blames him for Iris becoming a police officer. He is killed by Deathstorm.

Wally West / Kid Flash

Wallace "Wally" West (portrayed by Keiynan Lonsdale; main: seasons 2–4; guest: seasons 5–6 & 9) is Iris's previously unknown brother and Joe's son, described as "a bit of a wayward kid who has some attitude problems and some authority issues and is quick with a sassy remark". He develops speedster abilities (which originated from the Flashpoint timeline) through Doctor Alchemy and begins assisting Barry as Kid Flash.

Lonsdale also stars as the character on Legends of Tomorrow and originally auditioned to portray Jefferson "Jax" Jackson. He did not return full-time for season five due to wanting to seek other acting opportunities. It was always intended for Wally to be the son of Joe and brother of Iris, which differs from the character's comic history, as the producers felt it "weird" for second seasons of television series to introduce previously unmentioned cousins of established characters. The character inspired another character of the same name following DC's New 52 relaunch.

Clifford DeVoe / Thinker

Clifford DeVoe / Thinker (portrayed by Neil Sandilands; season 4) is a mild-mannered professor and metahuman with superhuman intelligence, who seeks to fix all that he deems wrong with humanity. His character was foreshadowed by Abra Kadabra and Savitar as Team Flash's future adversary. He and his wife Marlize create a "Thinking Cap" and exploit the particle accelerator to power it, but its dark matter drains energy from his body and leaves him with amyotrophic lateral sclerosis. They build a hover-chair to enhance him, but he develops a god complex and becomes apathetic and emotionless. He orchestrates Barry's release from the Speed Force to create 12 specific metahumans, who he then steals the bodies of in order to gain their powers. He serves as the main antagonist of season four.

 Kendrick Sampson, Sugar Lyn Beard, Miranda MacDougall, Arturo Del Puerto, and Hartley Sawyer portray DeVoe in different host bodies.

Cecile Horton

Cecile Horton (portrayed by Danielle Nicolet; main: seasons 5–9; recurring: seasons 3–4; guest: season 1) is the Central City district attorney and a close friend of Joe West. She would occasionally offer him legal advice, and they eventually begin dating. While pregnant with his daughter Jenna, she becomes a metahuman and develops empathic abilities and later telekinesis. Because of this, she begins specializing in metahuman cases. She often assists Team Flash and Team Citizen, and also has an older daughter named Joanie.

Ralph Dibny / Elongated Man

Ralph Dibny (portrayed by Hartley Sawyer; main: seasons 5–6; recurring: season 4) is a private investigator specializing in infidelity cases and metahuman with the ability to stretch his body to superhuman lengths and sizes, also allowing him to morph into other people. He was previously a detective for the CCPD until Barry exposed him for planting evidence. He acquires his powers through exposure to dark matter (which was set up by the Thinker) and stabilizes at S.T.A.R. Labs, where Barry decides to give him a second chance. He becomes an asset to Team Flash known as the Elongated Man. In subsequent seasons, he develops a partnership with Sue Dearbon.

Nora West-Allen / XS

Nora West-Allen (portrayed by Jessica Parker Kennedy; main: season 5; recurring: seasons 4 & 7–8; guest: season 9) is introduced as a mysterious girl with super-speed. She is first seen at Barry and Iris's wedding and interacts with Team Flash throughout the season. After helping Barry stop the Thinker's satellite, she reveals herself as his and Iris's daughter from 2049. Since she is from the future, certain actions in the present change major parts of  her history over the course of the series. Her lightning is initially yellow and purple, referencing both of her parents' lightnings. Season eight establishes her as lesbian.

Orlin Dwyer / Cicada

Orlin Dwyer (portrayed by Chris Klein; season 5) is one of the two main antagonists of season five. He gets his abilities after being struck by a fragment of the Thinker's satellite, which also leaves his niece Grace in a coma. Enraged by this and the loss of her mother (his sister) to an earlier metahuman incident, he vows to exterminate all metahumans using a telekinetic dagger that can nullify their abilities. Team Flash dubs him "Cicada". Secretly, he and Grace are aided by Dr. Ambres.

Mar Novu / Monitor

Monitor (portrayed by LaMonica Garrett; main: season 6; guest: season 5) is a multiversal being who uses the Book of Destiny to test Earths to see if they are capable of facing an upcoming crisis. Notably, he destroys Earth-90 and gives the Book of Destiny to John Deegan to test Earth-1's heroes.

Mobius / Anti-Monitor

The Anti-Monitor (portrayed by LaMonica Garrett; season 6) is a multiversal being who plots to destroy all the Earths in the multiverse with his anti-matter powers so that only the anti-matter universe remains.

Eva McCulloch / Mirror Monarch
 

Eva McCulloch (portrayed by Efrat Dor; seasons 6–7) is a quantum engineer, co-founder of McCulloch Technologies, and the wife of its CEO Joseph Carver who has been trapped in the Mirrorverse since the particle acceleration explosion. She begins pulling people in (notably Iris) and creates mirror imposters of those people to aid in her escape so that she may have revenge against Carver for abandoning her. She later discovers that she herself is a mirror duplicate and that the real Eva died during the explosion, and plots to replace everybody with mirror duplicates as Mirror Monarch.

She is based on the DC Comics character Evan McCulloch / Mirror Master and is the main antagonist of the second half of season six and the first three episodes of season seven.

Allegra Garcia
 
Allegra Garcia (portrayed by Kayla Compton; main: seasons 7–9; recurring: season 6) is a young metahuman with abilities based on the electromagnetic spectrum. As a child, she was incarcerated at Iron Heights for involvement with a gang called the Arañas alongside her cousin Esperanza, with whom she has a strained relationship. She joins Team Flash and Team Citizen after Barry and Cecile prove her innocence in a murder case and bonds with Nash after discovering that he was a father figure to her Earth-719 counterpart Maya. In season nine, she dates Chester.

 Compton also portrays Allegra's Earth-719 doppelgänger Maya, who traveled with Nash across the multiverse before dying during an expedition on Earth-13.
 In the Reverse-Flashpoint timeline, Allegra has broken up with Chester. Alex Danvers convinces them to rekindle their relationship.

Chester P. Runk

Chester P. Runk (portrayed by Brandon McKnight; main: seasons 7–9; guest: season 6) is a scientist with an online following who believes in keeping his code open-source. He meets Team Flash after accidentally opening a black hole that fuses with his consciousness. After Flash rescues him and Cecile helps him put his life back together, he begins assisting Team Flash as a tech specialist. In season nine, he begins dating Allegra.

 In the Reverse-Flashpoint timeline, Chester is friends with Ryan Choi and has broken up with Allegra. Alex Danvers convinces them to rekindle their relationship.

Mark Blaine / Chillblaine

Mark Blaine / Chillblaine (portrayed by Jon Cor; main: season 9; recurring: seasons 7–8) is a former Ivo Laboratories scientist who was fired for creating a microchip that he used to enhance his cryogenic technology. Calling himself Chillblaine, he steals it back and frames Frost for a murder. However, his infatuation and continued run-ins with her prompt him to become a better person, and they begin dating. He falls into a depression when Frost passes fighting Deathstorm and dedicates himself to resurrecting her, and is infuriated when Khione emerges in Caitlin's body and chooses to live her own life. He briefly joins Red Death and the Rogues in exchange for Frost's resurrection, but ultimately rejoins Team Flash.

Recurring characters
This is a list of recurring actors and the characters they portrayed in multiple episodes, which were significant roles, sometimes across multiple seasons. The characters are listed in order of appearance by the season in which they first appeared.

Introduced in season one

Gideon
Gideon (voiced by an uncredited Morena Baccarin; seasons 1-2 & 4–8) is an A.I. assistant created by Barry Allen in the original future timeline which somehow came to be used in Eobard Thawne's own plans. It is programmed to be loyal to both Barry and Eobard. Gideon is also shown to be loyal to Harry Wells, Clifford DeVoe, and Nora West-Allen.
  	
 Another version of the character (voiced by Amy Pemberton) is the on-board navigational assistant of the Waverider. Pemberton stars as the character on Legends of Tomorrow.

Ronnie Raymond / Firestorm

Ronnie Raymond / Firestorm (portrayed by Robbie Amell; seasons 1-3 & 8) is an engineer at S.T.A.R. Labs and Caitlin Snow's fiancé, based on the DC Comics character of the same name who is half of the character Firestorm. He is thought to be dead in the particle accelerator explosion, saving the lives of his co-workers. He survived the accident, which merged him with Martin Stein and the F.I.R.E.S.T.O.R.M. transmutation matrix, transforming both of them into one pyrokinetic entity. Though Firestorm is Ronnie's body, it is Stein who remains in control for most of their existence, with Ronnie occasionally taking control for brief moments. They eventually learn to control their shared powers, including an ability to separate themselves at will. Like Caitlin, Cisco, and Stein, Ronnie also becomes good friends with Barry Allen; he and Barry ultimately join forces with Oliver Queen to subdue the Reverse-Flash. Ronnie marries Caitlin.

In season two, Ronnie sacrifices himself to stop the singularity above Central City while separating himself from Stein to keep him alive.

In season three, the Speed Force uses Ronnie's form to help Barry realize the true meaning of sacrifice.

In season eight, the black flame speaks to Caitlin using Ronnie's voice. It turns out that Ronnie's guilt took on a life of its own which led to it becoming Deathstorm.

 Amell also portrays Ronnie Raymond / Deathstorm, the Earth-2 version of the character and Killer Frost's husband. He works for Zoom alongside Killer Frost and Reverb while Ronnie is killed by Zoom for harming the Flash.

Oliver Queen / Green Arrow

Oliver Queen / Green Arrow (portrayed by Stephen Amell; seasons 1–6 & 9) is a former-playboy billionaire and politician who operates as a vigilante in Star City and is a friend of Barry Allen's. He helps Barry in hand-to-hand combat and other skills to turn Barry into a capable combatant with or without powers. Amell stars as the character on Arrow.

 The Earth-2 version of his character died while his father Robert Queen became the Arrow instead. In the Arrow episode "Starling City", Adrian Chase has become the new Green Arrow.
 Amell also portrays Dark Arrow, the Earth-X version of the character.

General Wade Eiling

General Wade Eiling (portrayed by Clancy Brown; season 1) is a general with an interest in metahumans, who wants to use them for the U.S. Army, and has a history with S.T.A.R. Labs. Eiling learns of Barry Allen's identity as the Flash, however, Eobard Thawne gives the general to Grodd to be placed under the gorilla's control. After being freed by the Flash, he and Barry form a grudging respect despite their enmity.

Martin Stein
Martin Stein (portrayed by Victor Garber; seasons 1–4) is a nuclear physicist focused on transmutation, based on the DC Comics character of the same name and is also half of the character Firestorm. He remains in control of Firestorm during the initial merging, though Ronnie Raymond occasionally takes control for brief moments. They learn to control their shared powers, including an ability to separate themselves at will. Professor Stein also subsequently gives Barry Allen and Eddie Thawne some insight on the possibility of time travel and their respective destinies.

In season two, Stein becomes a member of Team Flash and the group's scientific advisor following Eobard Thawne's demise. He also discovers Cisco Ramon's secret as a metahuman and encourages him to accept his powers. When it turns out that his body is unstable as a consequence of the combination of the dark matter with Stein's own matrix, Stein gains a new partner in Jefferson "Jax" Jackson.

In season three, Stein discovers that he now has a daughter, Lily Stein, due to both Barry's and his own respective time-traveling actions; he never had a child due to his fear of being as neglectful as his father and his past commitments to his work prior to the timeline's reset.

In season four, Stein is killed when he tries to escape from Earth-X with Barry and other heroes.

 The Earth-2 version of the character is one-half of the conjoined metahuman criminal Deathstorm. Ronnie does not release Stein or listen to him and he eventually stops talking altogether. He is killed by Zoom alongside Deathstorm.

Nora Allen

Nora Allen (portrayed by Michelle Harrison; seasons 1-3 & 5 & 7–9) is Barry Allen's mother. Although the Reverse-Flash was actually trying to kill the young Barry during the fight with the Flash's future self, Nora became Reverse-Flash's target after young Barry was taken to safety, as he thought such a tragedy would prevent Barry from becoming Flash.

 Harrison voices the Earth-2 version of the character where she remains alive and happy.

Gregory Wolfe

Gregory Wolfe (portrayed by Anthony Harrison in season one, Richard Brooks in season four) is the corrupt prison warden of Iron Heights Prison who has connections to Amunet Black.

In season one, Warden Wolfe is first seen taking Barry Allen and Joe West to Jesse James' cell.

In season four, Warden Wolfe oversees the incarceration of Kilgore. When Barry is framed for Clifford DeVoe's "murder" and sentenced to life at Iron Heights without possibility of parole, Warden Wolfe incarcerates him in Henry Allen's former cell. After his hidden camera enables him to figure out that Barry is the Flash, Wolfe has Barry transferred to Iron Heights' metahuman wing. While planning to sell Killgore, Mina Chayton, Hazard, and Dwarfstar to Amunet, Wolfe is killed by Clifford DeVoe while stealing the abilities of the four metahumans. Mayor Van Buren believes that Wolfe died a hero until Iris' blog exposes his illegal activities. Wolfe is later succeeded by Del Toro.

Mason Bridge
Mason Bridge (portrayed by Roger Howarth; season 1) is a reporter at the Central City Picture News who mentors Iris West. He becomes suspicious of Eobard Thawne and finds evidence of Simon Stagg's murder. Mason is killed by the Reverse-Flash and all evidence erased, but his disappearance leads Barry and Joe to discover he was murdered for learning about Thawne. When Iris begins looking into Mason's disappearance, Eddie Thawne covers with a story, but Iris eventually learns the truth.

Linda Park

Linda Park (portrayed by Malese Jow; seasons 1–2) is a journalist for the Central City Picture News who befriends Iris West and Barry Allen. She briefly dates Barry in season one. The character was originally portrayed by Olivia Cheng in a cameo appearance on the series Arrow.

 Jow also portrays Doctor Light, the Earth-2 version of the character, based on the Kimiyo Hoshi version of the character. She is a thief who is very easily startled and paranoid and willing to do anything to stay out of Zoom's sights, including attempting murder so that she can take over her doppelgänger's life.

Hartley Rathaway / Pied Piper

Hartley Rathaway / Pied Piper (portrayed by Andy Mientus; seasons 1-2 & 6 & 9) – In season one, he is depicted as Eobard Thawne's former protégé, Cisco's rival, and an embittered genius who used to work at S.T.A.R. Labs. The particle accelerator explosion gave him superhuman hearing, but he needs custom-made hearing aids to help control his new power. He was also estranged from his parents after he came out. Following these, he developed sonic gloves and became a criminal; calling himself the "Pied Piper". As a result of timeline changes during season two, Hartley became an ally to Team Flash and reconciled with his parents.

During season six, in the post-Crisis timeline however, Hartley became a metahuman with full sonic powers on top of his gloves as well as an enemy to Team Flash once more as the Flash had destabilized his henchman/boyfriend, Roderick's, molecules during an altered version of one of their original fights. After combining their powers to defeat Godspeed, Team Flash was able to save Roderick while Hartley forgave Barry.

In season nine, Hartley's gauntlets are stolen by Captain Boomerang II and Fiddler II to further Red Death's plot. He helps Flash when it comes to dealing with Red Death and her minions. At one point, she engaged in a sign language conversation with Murmur II during their duel.

Lisa Snart / Golden Glider

Lisa Snart / Golden Glider (portrayed by Peyton List; seasons 1–2) is an aspiring criminal and Leonard Snart's younger sister. In season one, she shares a mutual attraction with Cisco Ramon who she initially kidnapped for her brother and coerced into creating a gun that turns things into gold, but later becomes genuinely fond of Cisco. Lisa later helped her brother free the metahuman criminals in the Pipeline.

In season two, Lisa sought Team Flash's help when her brother was found to be working for their abusive father Lewis Snart (later revealed to be due to her father threatening her life).

Mark Mardon / Weather Wizard

Mark Mardon / Weather Wizard (portrayed by Liam McIntyre; seasons 1-2 & 5) is a criminal with the ability to control the weather of his surroundings. Having similar powers to his sibling Clyde, Mark returns to Central City seeking revenge on Joe West for killing his brother. He was being held in the S.T.A.R. Labs prison before being set free by Leonard Snart and offered a place in his crew the "Rogues". Mark murdered Patty Spivot's father during a bank robbery with his brother months prior to the particle accelerator's explosion. He remains nursing his grudge against both Joe West and the Flash.

In season five, Mardon's estranged daughter Joslyn Jackam / Weather Witch tries to kill him in prison, but he is saved by the Flash.

Leonard Snart / Captain Cold

Leonard Snart / Captain Cold (portrayed by Wentworth Miller; seasons 1–3) is the son of a police officer and Lisa Snart's brother who turns to crime. Snart is a cunning and intelligent bank robber who seeks to eliminate the Flash and steals a cryonic gun from S.T.A.R. Labs, a weapon Cisco created as a failsafe to stop the Flash. Snart and Mick Rory attempt to kill The Flash but fail, though the Flash is revealed to the world. He extorts Flash's identity from Cisco and later becomes leader of his crew which Barry dubs the "Rogues". Barry later asks Snart to assist the transport of metahumans from Central City to Lian Yu, for which Snart wants his criminal record erased. He double-crosses Barry by sabotaging the truck containing Mark Mardon, Kyle Nimbus, Roy Bivolo, Jake Simmons and Shawna Baez. Snart kills Simmons who he claims owed him money. Leonard is later extorted into working for his father Lewis Snart when he plants a bomb inside Lisa's head. After Team Flash successfully remove it, Leonard kills Lewis out of spite and is arrested for his father's murder. He is later broken out by Mardon to get revenge on Barry but declines and warns Barry of Mardon's plans.

Snart had a part in turning Sam Scudder and Rosa Dillon into metahumans. When they come to seek revenge, Barry reveals that Snart is traveling with friends of theirs called the Legends. During the alien attack, the Legends appear, prompting Barry to ask Snart's whereabouts; it is said that Snart sacrificed himself to save the team, proving to be a hero.

Months later, Barry recruits Snart from a point in time where he was traveling with the Legends in an attempt to steal Dominator technology from A.R.G.U.S. The two succeed and Snart is returned to the Legends.

 The Earth-2 version of the character is the mayor of Central City.
 Miller also portrays Leo Snart, the Earth-X version of the character during "Crisis on Earth-X" crossover who operates as Citizen Cold. Leo is a vigilante and a member of the Freedom Fighters, a resistance movement against the New Reich in a Nazi-governed world; he is also the lover of Ray Terrill / The Ray. Leo later appears on Earth-1 where he helps Flash deal with Siren-X, a remnant of the New Reich who plans to detonate Fallout at the CCPD to avenge Dark Arrow's death. During this time, Leo helps Flash cope with what the Thinker did with Elongated Man. After Siren-X is defeated and Fallout is in A.R.G.U.S. custody, Leo returns to Earth-X to marry Ray.
 Miller also voices the Leonard A.I. on Earth-74's Waverider.

Tina McGee

Tina McGee (portrayed by Amanda Pays; seasons 1–2) is a friend of Harrison Wells (Earth-1 version), she is the director of Mercury Labs and the designer of the tachyon devices which allows any object to move at the speed of light. During seasons one and two, McGee has run-ins with Eobard Thawne involving her tachyon equipment and is aware of Barry Allen's secret. In season four (off screen), she is a member of Cisco Ramon's team to bring the Flash back from the Speed Force. Pays reprises the character from the 1990s TV series.
 Pays also makes an uncredited cameo appearance in "Crisis on Infinite Earths" via archival footage of the 1990s incarnation of Tina McGee, which are seen as memories that Earth-90's Flash looked back on before he sacrificed himself to save the multiverse. It was also stated that she and Earth-90 Barry got married sometime after the series and before "Elseworlds".

Mick Rory / Heat Wave

Mick Rory / Heat Wave (portrayed by Dominic Purcell; seasons 1–3) is an arsonist and accomplice of Leonard Snart who uses a heat gun developed by Cisco capable of burning almost anything. However, Mick's obsession for maximum destruction and failure to think causes tensions with Snart tempted to kill him.

 According to Leo Snart, the Earth-X version of the character died saving people.

John Diggle / Spartan

John Diggle / Spartan (portrayed by David Ramsey; seasons 1–9) is Oliver Queen's best friend and teammate. Ramsey stars as the character on Arrow.

Kendra Saunders / Chay-Ara / Hawkgirl

Kendra Saunders / Chay-Ara / Hawkgirl (portrayed by Ciara Renée; seasons 1–2) is a young woman who has been repeatedly reincarnated over the centuries. When provoked, her ancient warrior persona manifests itself, along with wings that grow out of her back. She is a potential love interest for Cisco Ramon.

Felicity Smoak

Felicity Smoak (portrayed by Emily Bett Rickards; seasons 1–4) is an information-technology genius and a member of Oliver Queen's team; later his wife. Also a good friend of Barry Allen. Rickards stars as the character on Arrow.

 Rickards also portrays the unnamed Earth-X version of the character, who is interned in a concentration camp under the Nazi regime.

David Singh

David Singh (portrayed by Patrick Sabongui; seasons 1–9) is introduced as the captain of the CCPD. In the season five finale, Singh gets promoted to Chief of Police by the Mayor and promotes Joe to his previous position. He reveals that by being a detective, he has figured out that Barry is the Flash.

In season six, Singh advises Joe to go into the witness protection program after the latter is attacked by the supervillain Rag Doll. After Joe does so, Singh is shown to have been replaced with a mirror clone being controlled by Eva McCulloch. To prepare for Eva's release, Mirror Singh leads Mirror Iris and Mirror Kamilla to where Bloodwork is held to get a blood sample from him. After Mirror Kamilla sacrifices herself to open Bloodwork's cell, Mirror Iris gets the blood through the most unlikely way as Mirror Singh works to cover up the power failure. Eva mentioned to Iris that the real Kamilla and Singh are in the Mirrorverse. When Iris finds the real Kamilla, she states that they need to find the real Singh before they can work on a way to get out of the Mirrorverse. Mirror Singh was sent to destroy a Black Hole storehouse. After Mirror Singh attempts to get Barry to give up Carver, Eva later sacrifices him during the raid on McCulloch Technologies.

In season seven, Iris manages to locate the real Singh at the Mirrorverse's version of Central City Hospital. When Eva was defeated, David was among the people released from the Mirrorverse.

In season eight, Singh visits Barry where informs them of a gamma absorption array being stolen from Mercury Labs.

 Sabongui also portrays the Earth-2 version of the character, who is a criminal.

Henry Allen

Henry Allen (portrayed by John Wesley Shipp; seasons 1-3 & 5 & 9) is Barry Allen's father. Shipp previously portrayed Barry Allen in the 1990 television series. Henry was a respectable doctor before he was wrongfully convicted of murdering his wife Nora Allen and incarcerated in Iron Heights Prison after Eobard Thawne framed him. Only his son Barry and later Joe West believe his innocence. Throughout season one, he learns that Barry is the Flash and is proud of his son. Henry serves as Barry's moral conscience in using these powers wisely, thus keeping Barry from being tempted by personal gains.

In season two, Henry is released from prison due to Eobard's confession to Nora's murder. However, he leaves Central City to seek a reclusive life as he believes that his presence could hold back Barry's duties as the Flash. He returns to counsel Barry and offer encouragement after his son's disastrous fight with Hunter Zolomon but then returns to seclusion. When Barry is de-powered, Henry joins S.T.A.R. Labs to help in Barry's fight to save the world from Zoom. Henry is killed by Zolomon in order for Barry to relive the same tragedy he went through when Nora was killed by the Reverse-Flash. Following his death, Henry's Earth-3 doppelgänger Jay Garrick takes over in mentoring Barry on power and responsibility.

 It is implied that the Earth-2 version of the character has a happy life.

Grodd

Grodd (voiced by David Sobolov; seasons 1-3 & 5–6 & 9) is a hyper-intelligent gorilla with telepathic powers as a result of being experimented on by General Eiling under the watch of Eobard Thawne.

He is sent to the Gorilla City on Earth-2 by Flash and later plans an attack to Central City with an army of the gorillas like him. However, he is defeated by Flash, Kid Flash, Jesse Quick and Solovar, and imprisoned at A.R.G.U.S.

Grodd later returns and mind-controls Cisco Ramon and Caitlin Snow into stealing Tanya Lamden's telepathy crown in his plot to take control of the minds of Central City. Sacrificing his restored humanity, Shay Lamden of Earth-2 becomes King Shark again and fights Grodd. With help from Flash and XS, King Shark defeats Grodd and removes the telepathy crown from him. It is later mentioned by Lyla that Grodd has been placed in a medically induced coma in a special cell that would adapt to his growing mental powers.

In season six, Grodd is still an induced coma when Barry is accidentally placed in his mind. While voicing his knowledge of the Crisis, Grodd states that he found out that Gorilla City is now on Earth-Prime and wants to return to it. To get past the gatekeeper, represented as a mental copy of Solovar, Grodd and Flash had to work together. Once that was done and Barry is back in his mind, Caitlin arranges for Grodd to be released on probation as Lyla places a tracking chip in him so that Team Flash will know where to find him if he returns to villainy.

In season nine, Grodd found that his tribe of gorillas lost their sentience following the Crisis and are scattered throughout Africa. Red Death approached Grodd with the offer to boost her psychic control over her sentinels in exchange for finding his tribe. Flash learned about this following an ambush by Red Death. After some persuasion from Grodd, Flash's speed is recharged by Grodd returning the speed sample Flash gave him. Following Red Death's defeat, Chester mentioned that the S.T.A.R. Labs satellites are working 24/7 to help find Grodd's tribe.

Introduced in season two

Jesse Wells / Jesse Quick

Jesse Chambers Wells / Jesse Quick (portrayed by Violett Beane; seasons 2–4) is the daughter of Harry Wells from Earth-2. Like her father Jesse is a science prodigy, having five majors in college, including biochemistry. Zoom holds Jesse captive to extort Harry's cooperation until she is rescued by her father, Barry, Cisco, and Earth-2's Barry and Iris. With her father, Jesse seeks refuge on Earth-1 and she leaves for Opal City after discovering the lengths Harry will take to keep her safe. Jesse returns after her father is kidnapped and works with the S.T.A.R. Labs team. Jesse and Wally are affected by dark matter when Harry attempts to restore Barry's speed; Barry later brings her out of her coma. Following Zoom's defeat, Jesse returns to Earth-2 with her father. Months later Jesse exhibits speedster abilities and aspires to help people, though her father disapproves. After she helps Barry stop Magenta, Harry becomes more encouraging and has Cisco make her a speedster suit. Jesse and Harry return to Earth-2, where Jesse becomes Earth-2's speedster superhero under the name Jesse Quick. Jesse and Wally admit their feelings, and have a long-distance relationship until she breaks up with Wally.

Hunter Zolomon / Zoom

Hunter Zolomon / Zoom (portrayed by Teddy Sears, initially portrayed by Ryan Handley, voiced by Tony Todd; seasons 2-3 & 5 & 9) is a speedster from Earth-2 who is obsessed with becoming the only speedster in the multiverse and the main antagonist of season two. Executive producer Andrew Kreisberg said, in season one "with the Reverse-Flash, we just modulated Tom Cavanagh's voice, and this year we wanted to do something a little bit different [for Zoom]. Part of the mystery of the season is who or what is underneath the Zoom outfit, and so we wanted to do something like James Earl Jones as Darth Vader — this iconic voice coming out of this mask." Hunter was a traumatized child (portrayed by Octavian Kaul) that witnessed his mother's murder at his father's hands, which triggered his bloodlust as a serial killer before he gained his powers from the particle-accelerator explosion on Earth-2. Dissatisfied, he sought to increase his speed with the Velocity serum but soon discovered it carried a fatal illness. Searching for a cure, he traveled the multiverse and captured Jay Garrick. Unsuccessful in stealing Jay's speed to cure himself, Hunter keeps Jay imprisoned with a speed-dampening mask. Inspired to be both hero and villain, he uses Jay's name as the fraudulent Flash of Earth-2 to instill false hope, which he then takes away as Zoom. Discovering Earth-1, he plots to increase Barry's speed and then steal it, sending various metahumans from Earth-2 to fight the Flash while also infiltrating the team as Jay. Zoom extorts Harry Wells into physically stealing Barry's speed by kidnapping Jesse Wells. He also becomes Caitlin Snow's love interest. After succeeding in stealing Barry's speed, Zoom brings his army of Earth-2 metahumans to conquer Earth-1 and construct a device capable of destroying the other Earths in the multiverse, to ensure he remains the only speedster. Hunter seeks to corrupt Caitlin's mind into being like Earth-2 Killer Frost and then Barry's by killing Henry in the same spot Eobard killed Nora, convinced that they are similar because of their childhood traumas. However, Barry ultimately bests Hunter in their final fight before two Time Wraiths arrive to punish him for his crimes against the time line; they transform him into the corpse-like Black Flash enslaved to the Speed Force. Subjugated to the Time Wraiths, the Black Flash makes occasional appearances in season three, such as to hurt Savitar before being killed by Earth-1 Killer Frost.

 Sears also briefly portrays the Earth-1 version of the character, a non-metahuman individual.

Jay Garrick / Flash

Jay Garrick (portrayed by John Wesley Shipp; seasons 2-4 & 6–9) is the Earth-3 version of Barry's father Henry Allen. Hunter Zolomon held Jay captive in a failed attempt to harness his speed before becoming inspired to take up his persona and falsely operate as the Flash of Earth-2; even going so far as to use Jay's name. To keep him from escaping, Zolomon forced Jay to wear a mask that suppressed his speed and prevented him from talking. After Zoom's defeat, Barry rescues Jay, who soon returns to his Earth. Jay adopts Hunter's Flash helmet as a symbol of hope, taking satisfaction in taking something from Zoom as the villainous speedster had done to him. Jay later learned from Harry Wells that Henry Allen is his doppelgänger and Barry is Henry's son. Knowing this, Jay watches over Barry as a sympathetic yet stern mentor, and a friendship develops. After undoing Flashpoint and trying to fix the mistakes left in its wake, he explains to Barry that time travel can have adverse consequences and that Barry must live with these mistakes. Jay also helps Barry come to terms with Henry's death and in battling Savitar. While they do banish Savitar to the Speed Force, Savitar later escapes, with Jay taking Savitar's place. After being freed, Jay joins Team Flash in the final battle to defeat Savitar. Jay later returns to help Barry use Flashtime, and reveals that he plans to retire and is training a protégée to become his successor as the Flash.

By season six, Jay has retired and settled down with his wife Joan. Barry does talk to him about the upcoming Crisis that is occurring in the Multiverse.

In season seven sometime after the Crisis, Jay is now living on Earth-Prime in Keystone City and regains his speed powers with the help of Joan. Before he can join the fight against the Godspeed Drones in Central City, he ends up taken captive by them to draw Bart out. It is revealed that the future of 2040 Jay Garrick helps mentor Bart Allen, and he gets killed by Godspeed, which makes Bart swear revenge to kill Godspeed/August Heart, not realizing that the real August Heart is comatose and that the people who killed Jay were actually Godspeed drones. Flash and Nora were able to rescue Jay and Bart with help from Mecha-Vibe. Jay later helped out in fighting the Godspeed Drones. Following Godspeed's defeat and Eobard Thawne getting away, Jay and Joan were present when Barry and Iris renew their vows.

In season eight, Jay's death in 2040 was erased upon Godspeed's death. Unfortunately, an event has erased Joan as Jay is married to a woman named Rose causing Nora and Bart to find the time anomaly responsible on December 31, 2013. After Nora and Bart fixed the timeline, Jay's marriage to Joan is restored as Jay mentions to Bart and Nora about his own time-travel adventures like one where he fought Nazis in World War II. Before departing, he mentions his upcoming meeting with President Lex Luthor which he then mentions that he was kidding about it. Jay and Joan from 2040 help Joe find Iris in the time stone that Darhk gave Joe. He later helps Barry in his fight with Thawne.

Based on the DC Comics character of the same name.

 Regarding the difference in his portrayal of Garrick over Allen, Shipp "figured Jay is my version of Barry" from the 1990 series, adding, "I went back and I watched a couple of episodes of the 1990–91 version to kind of remind myself what I did. [Jay] is much more reminiscent of my Barry Allen from 25 years ago than my Henry Allen. I went back and I was amazed how much attitude my Barry Allen had in some situations. I went back and I picked up that thread and I brought it forward 25 years, and tried to weave it in."
 Shipp later reprises his role of Barry Allen from the 1990 television series in the crossover "Elseworlds". It is also revealed that the series is situated on Earth-90 and therefore like Garrick, this Flash is also Henry Allen's doppelgänger. Later, in the crossover "Crisis on Infinite Earths", he sacrificed himself destroying the Anti-Monitor's anti-matter cannon; taking Earth-1 Barry's place after the Monitor foretold "The Flash" must die during Crisis, but not specifying which one.

Patty Spivot

Patty Spivot (portrayed by Shantel VanSanten; season 2) is Joe West's new protégée and partner, a member of the metahuman task force at CCPD along with Cisco, and a love interest of Barry Allen. Her father was murdered by Mark Mardon during a bank robbery prior to the particle accelerator's explosion, leaving Patty determined to stop metahuman criminals. She believes that having superhuman power brings out the best or the worst in people, and acknowledges the Flash's heroism. Her hatred for Mark stems from survivor's guilt; when she was a teenager, she was supposed to make the deposit at the bank where her father died. When Patty gets her chance at revenge on Mark, the Flash persuades her to choose justice over vengeance. She leaves Central City to pursue her studies in the Forensic Science program at Midway City University. She also deduces Barry's secret identity and offers to stay if Barry confirms his feelings for her, but Barry admits nothing, not wanting to stop Patty from pursuing her studies. Patty surreptitiously does get Barry to reveal the Flash persona to her as she departs Central City, thus ending their relationship on good terms.

 The Earth-2 version of the character is stated to be a scientist in the Criminal and Forensic Science Division in the Central City Police Department.

Francine West
Francine West (portrayed by Vanessa A. Williams; seasons 2–3) is Iris West's and Wally West's mother and Joe West's estranged wife. Francine abandoned her family years prior to Joe taking Barry Allen in, out of guilt of endangering Iris through her drug abuse. After settling in Keystone City and following Wally's birth, Francine becomes sober from her addiction and a good mother to her son. After being diagnosed with MacGregor's syndrome (a terminal illness related to substance abuse), she tries to reconcile with her family and to entrust Wally to them before she dies. Joe and Iris forgive Francine on her deathbed and accept Wally as part of the family.

Savitar later uses Francine's likeness to agitate Wally.

Speed Force

The Speed Force (portrayed primarily by Michelle Harrison; seasons 2-3 & 6–8) is an interdimensional cosmic force of nature behind speedsters' abilities. The Speed Force would help Barry and other speedsters during seasons 2, 3, 6, 7 and 8.

Introduced in season three

Kara Zor-El / Kara Danvers / Supergirl

Kara Zor-El / Kara Danvers / Supergirl (portrayed by Melissa Benoist; seasons 3–6) is Barry Allen's friend and ally from Earth-38 who is an extraterrestrial superhero from the doomed planet Krypton. They met after Barry accidentally breached the dimensional barrier separating his and Kara's universes when testing a tachyon device (see "Worlds Finest"). Supergirl proves herself as a trusted ally after she travels to Earth-1 to help its heroes resist an alien invasion, and Oliver Queen and Barry entrusted her with a device that enables her to travel and communicate between her universe and theirs. She and her allies occasionally join Barry and other Earth-1 heroes on missions. Benoist reprises the role from Supergirl.

 Benoist also portrays Overgirl, the Earth-X version of the character.

Cynthia / Gypsy

Cynthia / Gypsy (portrayed by Jessica Camacho; seasons 3–6) is a bounty hunter from Earth-19 with similar powers to Vibe.

In season 6, Gypsy is murdered by Cisco's Earth-19 doppelganger Echo. She was later avenged when Cisco defeated Echo and had him arrested by the Collectors.

Tracy Brand
Tracy Brand (portrayed by Anne Dudek; season 3) is an eccentric doctoral student who studies speedsters with "a smorgasbord of quirky idiosyncrasies". Introduced in season three, she is targeted by Savitar due to her future self aiding Savitar's defeat in 2021. Tracy later aligns herself with Team Flash to fulfill her destiny against Savitar and becomes a love interest of H.R. Wells in the process. She later witnesses H.R. being killed by Savitar and hates the rogue time-remnant.

In season four, Tracy is state to be one of the scientists who helped Cisco Ramon bring Barry Allen back from the Speed Force. It is also implied she received her PhD and is now working as a scientist.

Julian Albert / Alchemy

Julian Albert Desmond / Alchemy (portrayed by Tom Felton; season 3) is a scientist and fellow CSI at the CCPD, who came from a prosperous old English family. The character was originally known as Julian Dorn. In season three, he works with Barry Allen though they did not initially get along. As Alchemy, he is an acolyte of Savitar who unlocks the potential in metahumans from the Flashpoint timeline in preparation for a future event. Julian is not aware he is Alchemy, and that he only assumes the guise while being unconsciously possessed by Savitar. Tobin Bell voices Doctor Alchemy. To fix what he made as Alchemy, Julian decides to join the team to help against Savitar and other metahumans. Julian and Caitlin Snow develop a romantic relationship.

In season four, it is revealed that Julian returned to the United Kingdom.

Carla Tannhauser
Dr. Carla Tannhauser (portrayed by Susan Walters; seasons 3 & 5-6 & 8) is Caitlin's estranged mother, Thomas Snow's wife, a biomedical engineer, and CEO of a major research company.

In season five, Carla is later captured by her husband's Icicle form and is placed in a cryo-tank before being rescued by Killer Frost.

In season eight, Carla assists in an attempt to capture the black flame. It is also revealed that she is starting to develop her own cryokinesis. Carla was present at Frost's funeral.

Introduced in season four

Marlize DeVoe
Marlize DeVoe (portrayed by Kim Engelbrecht; season 4) is a highly intelligent engineer who designs devices for her husband Clifford DeVoe. Initially, she was loyal and would join the Thinker in harassing and mocking Team Flash every time they score a victory, but as Clifford's original personality begins to be replaced by increasing cruelty and arrogance, she comes to realize that the husband she loved was gone and helps Team Flash defeat DeVoe in the final battle.

Sharon Finkel
Sharon Finkel (portrayed by Donna Pescow; season 4) is a therapist who Barry Allen and Iris West visit, as do Team Flash's other members.

Amunet Black

Amunet Black (portrayed by Katee Sackhoff; seasons 4 & 6) is a metahuman crime lord who operates an underground black market for metahuman supervillains and the ex-lover of Goldface. Originally an air hostess named Leslie Jocoy, she has the power to manipulate metal, but prefers using special metal shards when in combat. Amunet convinced Caitlin Snow to work with her, promising her a cure. Caitlin later leaves her employ, but Amunet repeatedly tries to coerce Caitlin back to her side. Team Flash later forms a truce with Amunet when her henchman Norvok plots to sell her metal shards. During this time, she theorizes that Caitlin could not access Killer Frost due to a placebo effect. After making a device for Team Flash to use against the Thinker's Enlightenment device, Amunet escapes in a metallic tornado.

In season 6 while largely unaffected by the Crisis, Amunet returns when she engages Goldface in a turf war as both of them were after the Rappaccini's Daughter flower. The Flash stops them by releasing pollen from said flower, causing the two crime lords to hear what they really think about each other.

In season 8, Amunet sent Goldface and his men to raid the Central City Police Department to steal the meta-bullets.

In season 9, Amunet was mentioned to be incarcerated when Goldface got a reduced sentence by mentioning that Amunet was behind the raid on Central City Police Department.

Matthew Norvock
Matthew Norvock (portrayed by Mark Sweatman; seasons 4–7) is a metahuman henchman of Amunet Black, whose prosthetic right eye hides a tentacle-like appendage that he uses as a weapon. He tried to sell some of Amunet Black's metal to other crime lords in an act of betrayal, but she defeats him after she cuts off the snake-like creature and he is arrested by Joe West.

He later appears in season 5 as one of the metahumans Cicada is hunting and in season 6 helping Killer Frost track down Bloodwork.

He makes an appearance in Season 7 as an observer during Frost's trial, thanking her for showing the public that criminals can be redeemed, since she willingly is going to prison to pay for her crimes.

Officer Jones
Officer "Jonesy" Jones (portrayed by Klarc Wilson; seasons 4–5) is a member of the Central City Police Department. After being controlled by Spin in season 5, Jones leaks the names of several meta-humans to Cicada. When Cecile Horton figures it out, Singh has an angered Jones arrested.

Introduced in season five

Vanessa Ambres
Dr. Vanessa Ambres (portrayed by Lossen Chambers; season 5) is an ER doctor at Central City Hospital who shares Cicada's anti-metahuman sentiment, having treated many victims of metahuman attacks and losing her fiancé Darius during Zoom's rampage. She watches over Grace Gibbons and reluctantly protects Orlin Dwyer, even stealing drugs from the ER to help him deal with the injury in his chest. After helping Team Flash cure him, Dr. Ambres is killed by an adult Grace dressed as Cicada.

Thomas Snow / Icicle

Thomas Snow / Icicle (portrayed by Kyle Secor; season 5) is Caitlin Snow's father and Carla Tannhauser's husband.

Though he was believed to have died of ALS, Thomas is found in an arctic lab by Barry, Caitlin, and Cisco after Ralph discover that Snow's death certificate was faked. They later learn that in his attempt to cure his ALS, he became a cryogenic metahuman with an evil personality like Caitlin. When most of Team Flash start to freeze, Caitlin proves to be immune just before Killer Frost reemerges. Father and daughter engage in an ice battle. After Thomas's personality briefly surfaces, Icicle knocks Killer Frost back and gets away.

Icicle later returns with a plan to eliminate Caitlin and her mother Carla's human sides. He is about to kill Caitlin, when Thomas Snow suddenly finds the strength to return to his human form. When Caitlin is attacked by Cicada, Thomas sacrifices himself to save his daughter's life.

Grace Gibbons / Cicada II

Grace Gibbons (portrayed by Islie Hirvonen as a pre-teen, Sarah Carter as an adult; season 5) is the orphaned niece of Orlin Dwyer who lost her parents in a metahuman incident. She was placed in a coma after being caught in the Enlightenment Satellite's falling debris, which also affected her uncle. Later, when Nora West-Allen (XS) enters Grace's mind, it is revealed that she is consciously aware of what's happening despite her comatose state because a tiny shard from the satellite affected her brain; turning her into a metahuman and forming a mental barrier to prevent further invasions. Trapped in her painful memories and negative emotions, Grace now shares her uncle's hatred of all metahumans despite being one and is implied to be even more powerful than him. Now she declares war against the Flash and XS, vowing to make them pay by any means necessary. When Orlin is cured of his metahuman abilities, an adult Grace from the future attacks S.T.A.R. Labs, kills Dr. Ambres, and abducts him. The adult Grace comes from a future where metahumans thrive, so she has taken up the mantle of Cicada upon awaking from her coma to complete her uncle's mission of killing them all, serving as one of the two main antagonists of season five. She first targets Vickie Bolen, a metahuman who accidentally caused her parents' death. During her fight with the Flash, Grace is confronted by her uncle, who tries to reason with her, which leads to her killing him before fleeing. As Orlin dies in Flash's arms, he tells him to save Grace. Grace later kidnaps her younger self from the hospital. She then crashes the battle between Team Flash and Icicle, stealing the cryo-atomizer Icicle had stolen earlier. She then steals prototype versions of S.T.A.R. Labs' metahuman cure, which she can weaponize into a lethal version with the cryo-atomizer. Nora re-enters Grace's mind and with a version of Orlin successfully convinces her to abandon her anti-metahuman feelings. Meanwhile, the adult Grace ceases to exist after the Flash destroys her dagger with a Mirror Gun. Present day Grace is mentioned to have been placed in a foster home.

Trevor Shinick
Trevor Shinick (portrayed by Everick Golding; season 5) is a prison guard at Iron Heights Prison in 2049. He is in charge of Eobard Thawne's cell in the meta-human wing.

Kamilla Hwang
Kamilla Hwang (portrayed by Victoria Park; seasons 5–7) is a bartender and aspiring photographer that Cisco starts dating after breaking up with Gypsy. Following this, she gets a job as a photographer for the Central City Citizen under Iris West-Allen and provides occasional assistance at S.T.A.R. Labs. After Cisco took a leave of absence from Team Flash, Kamilla took a more active role by filling in for him in certain areas until he returned. While working late at the Citizen however, she discovered evidence that Iris had been replaced by a mirror clone. Before she could alert the rest of Team Flash, the clone shot her with McCulloch Technologies' mirror gun while Eva McCulloch created a mirror clone of her so their enemies wouldn't get suspicious. Mirror Kamilla sacrifices herself to briefly open Bloodwork's cell. Eva mentions to Iris that the real Kamilla and Singh are in the Mirrorverse somewhere. Iris manages to find Kamilla. Before they can work on a way to get out of the Mirrorverse, Kamilla is told by Iris that they need to find Singh first. When Iris manages to locate the real Singh at the Mirrorverse's version of Central City Hospital, Kamilla witnesses her vanishing.

In season seven, Kamilla is released from the Mirrorverse following Eva's defeat. She and Cisco later leave Central City when she got a job offer.

Jenna West
Jenna West is the daughter of Joe West and Cecile Horton, the younger half sister of Iris West-Allen and Wally West, and the maternal half sister of Joanie born on screen in season 4 finale.

Introduced in season six

Ramsey Rosso / Bloodwork

Ramsey Rosso (portrayed by Sendhil Ramamurthy; seasons 6 & 9) is a physician with a genius intellect, the world's leading expert on hematological oncology and a former colleague of Caitlin Snow, who is turned into the villain Bloodwork by his desire to defy the laws of nature and the main antagonist of the first half of season six. After his mother dies of HLH, Rosso developed a cure for the disorder using dark matter; even in spite of Caitlin's warnings. Though he ran numerous simulations that showed otherwise, he was turned into a metahuman after testing the cure on himself as he was also dying of HLH. In his pursuit to cure himself, he discovered he could use his abilities to transform people into zombie-like monsters by draining their blood and manipulating them. After learning adrenaline-filled blood worked best, he killed dozens of people to increase his strength before eventually attacking the Flash. With the speedster under his control, he attempted to convert all of Central City into his "Blood Brothers and Sisters", only to be foiled by Team Flash's teamwork. Though he transformed into a blood monster and nearly killed the Flash in retaliation, the speedster was able to trap him in a special machine previously used to contain Chester Runk's black hole-based powers before remanding him to A.R.G.U.S.'s custody. Months later, Eva McCulloch sent her mirror clones to get a sample of Rosso's blood and break him out, but he only agreed to the former; choosing to stay imprisoned and "play the long game".

Daisy Korber
Daisy Korber (portrayed by Stephanie Izsak; seasons 6–9) is a member of the Central City Police Department.

In season seven, Daisy is the first person to be replaced with a mirror duplicate. She was later released following Eva's defeat.

In season eight, Daisy was among the police officers taken captive when Goldface invades the CCPD to get the anti-meta bullets. Barry later beats her in an eating contest sometime after Frost's sacrifice. After Doctor Light and Sunshine got away, Korber informs Allegra that they had Doctor Light and Sunshine's assets frozen and the authorities are still looking for them.

Esperanza Garcia / Ultraviolet
Esperanza Garcia / Ultraviolet (portrayed by Alexa Barajas, voiced by Erika Soto in season 7; seasons 6–8) is a metahuman assassin and cousin of Allegra who also has abilities based on the electromagnetic spectrum. She was believed to have been killed during the original particle accelerator explosion, but was taken in, revived, and trained to become an assassin by Black Hole. In addition, Ultraviolet's vocal cords were removed by Dr. Olsen which explains the special mask to help her speak. After attacking CCPD to kill Allegra, she was defeated by the Flash and sent to Iron Heights. Following this, she made minor reappearances during a criminal gala held by Remington Meister, attacking Sue Dearbon for stealing a diamond with information on Black Hole, and being swayed to Eva McCulloch's side alongside Doctor Light and Sunshine.

In season seven, Ultraviolet starts to go after Dr. Olsen to exact her revenge which leads to her running into Allegra and Sue Dearbon. When catching up to Dr. Olsen later, she was promised to be fully healed if she takes out Allegra. Both of them were defeated by Allegra. With Dr. Olsen in police custody, Allegra mentions to Ultraviolet that Caitlin now has Dr. Olsen's notes so that she can work on healing her. Caitlin was able to remove the Black Hole chip from Ultraviolet's chip. Upon Caitlin putting a special collar on her, Ultraviolet still wants to go after the remnants of Black Hole despite Allegra's objection. By the time Allegra caught up to her, most of the remnants were taken out at the cost of Ultraviolet's life. She disintegrated in Allegra's arms.

Sue Dearbon

Sue Dearbon (portrayed by Natalie Dreyfuss; seasons 6–8) is a missing person that Ralph Dibny had been attempting to find ever since the season five finale before appearing in season six as a thief with connections to Black Hole. When Ralph first found her, Sue manipulated him into helping her get a diamond from a low level criminal before making off with it. At her hideout, Sue discovered information on Black Hole embedded in the diamond. She later robbed several banks used by the organization with one of them being under the alias of "January Galore" (portrayed by Rebecca Roberts), only to encounter Ralph and Cisco. She gave them the diamond and explained Black Hole was extorting her parents before departing once more. During a third encounter, Ralph discovers Sue joined Black Hole to kill its leader, Joseph Carver. Despite some difficulty, he was able to talk her out of it. After Carver's wife, Eva McCulloch, killed him, Sue believed she could return to her family until she learned Eva framed her for the murder.

In season seven, it is mentioned that Sue and Ralph are off the grid. She later returned where she poses as a police officer to warn Joe about Eva's plot and Ralph finding the evidence to clear her name. Following the Mirror Eva giving up, Sue and Ralph left to find other organizations like Black Hole and take them out. Sue later returned to help Chester and Allegra deal with Cecile when she is controlled by Psycho-Pirate's mask, while breaking in the museum Sue performs a lasers-dodging dance and a front handspring, the possessed Cecile uses her powers on Sue to tranquilize herself before recovered at med bay. Sue arrives at CC Jitters to stop Ultraviolet from attacking Allegra then they capture her outside the hospital, at the Team Flash base Sue and Ultraviolet start to fight as Sue does a cartwheel when Chester gets hit by Ultraviolet's blast before she teleports to find Olsen, Sue and Allegra have an argument about what happened, the team locates Ultraviolet at the warehouse. Sue defeats Dr. Olsen's men with her cartwheel somersault.

In season eight, Sue visits Iris mentioning that Black Hole has been defeated and her parents are incarcerated enabling Sue to take over their business. She accompanies Iris to Coast City to investigate the Coast City Phantom. They find it in the form of Tinya Wazzo who is looking for her birth mother who abandoned her. Sue and Iris persuaded her to come with them.

Introduced in season seven

Kristen Kramer

Kristen Kramer (portrayed by Carmen Moore; seasons 7–9) is a woman of Wet'suwet'en descent who serves as a liaison from the Governor's Municipal Logistics Commission. After Iris did a background check on her, Kristen admits to Joe that she is hunting Killer Frost. Her other background is that the platoon she was part of was led into an ambush by an unidentified metahuman that they trusted which led to her issues with metahumans that claim that they can do good. When Killer Frost was apprehended and put on trial, Kramer used Councillor Strong to push Judge Tanaka's decision to use the meta-cure on Killer Frost. This is thwarted when Killer Frost opted to serve a life sentence to atone for her past misdeeds. Kramer later returned where she was investigating the disappearance of Rainbow Raider. She was also having the metahuman cure bullets be made causing Joe to resign from the CCPD. Joe later found information thanks to a military contact that Kristen actually lead her unit into an ambush as Joe claims to Cecile that she was working with the enemy that wiped out her platoon. Kramer did not lead her men into the ambush deliberately - her brother (not by blood) Adam Creyke did. He just warned her to stay away and she didn't realize what was about to happen. She has blamed herself ever since and is now asking Joe to help her track Adam down. While staking out Creyke's boat, Joe and Kristen are ambushed. They managed to turn the tide on Creyke and take him prisoner. After informing the FBI everything about him, Kramer and Joe started to return to Central City where they witnessed its civilians leaving town and two Godspeed Drones fighting each other. It turns out that she is a metahuman who can copy the ability of any meta in close proximity for a short period of time. Thus she survived the explosion that took out the rest of her unit by copying Adam's invulnerability and later gains superspeed to save Joe from a Godspeed clone. Realizing what her actions have caused, she decides to take a leave of absence and sort of get her head straight.

In season eight, Kristen Kramer appeared on Iris West's podcast about her recent experience of copying metahuman abilities and mentioned that she has disbanded the Anti-Metahuman Task Force. She was later seen investigating the microchip robbery that was caused by a metahuman incarnation of the Royal Flush Gang. Kramer later asks for Barry's badge during Xotar's crime spree when Barry was suspected of being Joseph Carver's other mole which Barry has no knowledge of. He gives her his badge as Kramer states that she will try to find proof of his innocence. This accusation was undone when Barry undoes the Reverse-Flashpoint timeline that Eobard Thawne caused. When Goldface raids the Central City Police Department to get the meta-bullets which he heard about from Blacksmith, Kristen and Barry are among those taken captive. Though Kristen managed to break free from her meta-dampening bracelets that were also rigged to explode by mimicking their energy. After mentioning how she unintentionally mimicking the heat abilities of a barista on the ice coffee she ordered while explaining how she can't control it, Barry learns that she has a hard time asking for help. Barry persuades her to hold off Goldface when he has used his chain to strangle Daisy Korber. After Flash helped defeat Goldface and his henchmen, Kramer deduced that Barry was Flash and he agreed to train her improve her abilities as Kramer also revealed that she transferred the meta-bullets to A.R.G.U.S. five weeks ago.

In season nine, Kristen Kramer informs Barry about a possible promotion for him. When Red Death and her Rogues raid the CCPD, Kramer does copy Rainbow Raider's ability before Red Death places the power-dampening cuffs on her. After Flash and Gorilla Grodd work together to undo Red Death's control, Red Death finds that Kramer snuck away.

Alexa Rivera / Fuerza
Alexa Rivera / Fuerza (portrayed by Sara Garcia; seasons 7–8) is a social aid health worker who is working hard to overcome a dark past as she helps the underprivileged in Central City. But when Alexa uncovers a mysterious connection to the all-powerful Strength Force, she becomes Team Flash's most dangerous threat yet where she assumes the form of a hulking female that becomes responsible for killing Abra Kabadra. After being apparently killed by the Speed Force, Flash and Nora were able to revive her. With the same device that Caitlin used to talk to Frost when they shared the same body, Alexa speaks to Fuerza who helps Flash subdue Psych and persuade him to come to S.T.A.R. Labs with him. With Deon by her side, the Speed Force later zaps Alexa, Iris, and Psych. She, Deon, and Psych later helped Flash to snap the Speed Force back to her senses. Afterwards, Alexa moves in with the Speed Force.

In season eight, Cecile helps Psych rescue Fuerza. She and the other positive force avatars empower Flash so that he can defeat Eobard Thawne.

 Garcia also portrays the Negative Strength Force's representation of Fuerza. Unlike the other Fuerza, this version doesn't assume a hulking female form and possesses super-strength.

Deon Owens
Deon Owens (portrayed by Christian Magby; seasons 7–8) is a teenage football star who got a salesman job following a career-ending job that became a conduit for the Still Force. Deon later encountered Flash and aged the component for the vest Cisco was making to keep the Still Force from leaving his body. After Flash aborted his time-travel trip to keep the Strength Force, the Sage Force, and the Still Force from being created, Deon is confronted by the Speed Force's Nora form who sways him into an alliance. Deon was able to freeze Flash in place so that the Speed Force can zap Iris, Alexa, and Bashir. He, Fuerza, and Psych later helped Flash to snap the Speed Force back to her senses. Afterwards, Deon moves in with the Speed Force. Deon later preserves Iris in a time loop due to the dangers that the Godspeed War is causing.

In season eight, Deon visits Iris where she notes her suspicion about someone causing her father's death which Barry doesn't know. Deon discovers that someone has tapped into the Reverse Still Force. Upon Deon sending Barry to 2030, he found out that Eobard Thawne was responsible where he caused the Reverse-Flashpoint timeline. Iris later speaks to him about the time fluxes that she has been suffering. After investigating, Deon delivers the bad news to Iris. He states to her that her condition is causing time to fracture around her. He advises her to notify him if it gets worse. As her time sickness got worse and worse, Deon got sick as well. Due to this, while Flash is brought into the Still Force by Deon, he double-crosses him and traps him in an area of the Still Force while making off with the device needed to find Iris. In reality however, Deon lost access to his body and is now possessed by the Negative Still Force. He used some of his remaining strength to send X-S to save Flash. Deon later approaches the imprisoned Eobard Thawne and states that it is time to "fulfill his destiny". Their conversation ended with Deon killing Thawne by aging him to death and sacrifices Iris so that Thawne can be revived in his time remnant counterpart's body. Cecile helps Psych rescue the real Deon. He and the other positive force avatars empower Flash so that he can defeat Eobard Thawne. Afterwards, the Still Force is fixed enough to return everything that was displaced by the Negative Still Force back to its respective locations.

Bashir Malik / Psych
Bashir Malik / Psych (portrayed by Ennis Esmer; seasons 7–8) is a man previously abandoned by his biological and adoptive parents whose psychic abilities make people experience their worst fears. These include Cecile's fear of someone in a straitjacket, Barry's fear of his enemies, in the form of Eobard Thawne and Savitar, defeating him as well as his failure to keep everyone alive, Vibe seeing Kamilla in danger, and Killer Frost being handed over to the police by Caitlin Snow. With help from Cecile, Flash managed to defeat Psych, who faded away. The Speed Force later suspects that Psych and Fuerza are beings just like her. This is later confirmed when Cisco later considered him a conduit for the Sage Force. Iris, Allegra, and Kamilla later encountered Psych in the Allen family's old home where he subjected them to their worst fears. They escaped from Psych during Barry's trip to the past. Flash and Iris later learned about his past when he started going after the League of Lions members from his old high school that are now millionaires and placing them in catatonic conditions. When it came to the latest person, Flash was able to talk him down with Fuerza's help and he came along with them quietly while undoing the effects of the League of Lions members. When the Speed Force raided S.T.A.R. Labs with Deon, Psych, Iris, and Alexa were zapped by the Speed Force, something revealed to have been an illusion used to trick the Speed Force. He, Fuerza, and Psych later helped Flash to snap the Speed Force back to her senses. Afterwards, Psych moves in with the Speed Force.

In season eight, Cecile rescues Psych with her abilities. Then she helps him rescue the other positive force avatars and later empowers Flash so that he can defeat Eobard Thawne.

 Esmer also portrays the Negative Sage Force's representation of Psych.

Bart West-Allen / Impulse

Bart Allen / Impulse (portrayed by Jordan Fisher; seasons 7–8) is the son of Barry Allen and Iris West and younger brother of Nora West-Allen (who was manifested into existence after the Crisis) from the future. He showed up with Nora in the present where he meets Barry. During his time, he lost his grandfather Jay Garrick to Godspeed where Bart considered Godspeed to be his version of Eobard Thawne. When the present day Jay was captured by the Godspeed Drones, Bart tried to rescue him only for the attacks of the Godspeed Drones to place him in a coma with his speed-healing helping him out.

In season eight, Nora and Bart time-travel to 2013 where they investigate why Joan was erased. They managed to undo Joan's erasing. When Iris appeared in 2040, Nora was unable to return her to her own time due to the Negative Still Force. After Joan Williams confirms that there are negative tachyons in Iris, Nora heads to Flash's time to warn him of it. Bart and Nora later help Flash in fighting Eobard Thawne.

Introduced in season eight

Despero

Despero (portrayed by Tony Curran; season 8) is an alien from a point in the future where Flash supposedly brought armageddon to Earth. His abilities come from the Fires of Py'tar, and he also wears a special belt that allows him to travel through time and assume a human form. Some of Despero's history involved him being part of a rebellion against a tyrant that he was unable to bring himself to kill resulting in Despero being banished from Earth. He traveled to the present to dispose of Flash where he also fought Atom. After the confrontation and reading Flash's mind, Despero gave him seven days to prove him wrong or else he will do away with him. When Despero catches up to Flash at the former S.T.A.R. Labs hideout that he and the other superheroes used, he witnesses Deon Owens sending Flash to 2030. Despero proceeded to torture Team Flash until Flash undid the Reverse-Flashpoint timeline. Flash stated that Eobard Thawne was responsible for what happened and to head to 2030 to see if any changes happened there. Despero assumes his true form and heads there. Afterwards, Despero begins to target Thawne which involved mind-controlling a time-traveling Mia Queen. It was then revealed that Despero was the tyrant who was overthrown and exiled. With help from the technology provided by Chester, Barry was able to cut off Despero's access to the Fires of Py'tar causing Despero to get away.

Deathstorm

Deathstorm (portrayed by Robbie Amell; season 8) is a being of negative cold fusion energy that was created from Ronnie Raymond's sacrifice. In a black flame form, he was responsible for killing Stan Mullins, Donna Winters, Caitlin's yoga teacher Parker DeStefano, Colin Smith, Megan Landa, and Veronica Binning where they each suffered a grief. After impersonating Quincy P. Runk to get to Chester, Deathstorm manipulated Caitlin into using the Quantum Splicer so that he can have a physical body. This happened when Caitlin and Frost confronted it at Piedmont State Park attacking six campers after thwarting an attempt to contain it. He is restored but Caitlin notices there are an occasional irregularity with his body and he later assumed his Deathstorm form. While feeding off of more grieving people, he plans to make Caitlin into his bride to end his loneliness. After impersonating Ultraviolet to fight Allegra, Deathstorm dodges Flash and took Caitlin to Ripley's Wild World where he killed some of the people there to feed off the grief. As he starts to use his powers on her, Deathstorm flees upon declaring that Caitlin is not ready, impersonating Eddie Thawne to get to Iris. While feeding off of Team Flash's grief, Deathstorm is confronted by Frost as Hellfrost, saving Caitlin and consuming Deathstorm.

Tinya Wazzo / Phantom Girl

Tinya Wazzo (portrayed by Mika Abdalla; season 8) is a girl with ghost abilities that has been operating as the Coast City Phantom. Iris and Sue take her along to help her in finding her birth mother Renee who abandoned her. When they did find Renee, Iris' time sickness caused Renee to disappear into the Still Force leaving Tinya devastated. She later makes Iris disappear and advises Sue not to go after her again. Barry later visits Tinya in Coast City hoping to get her to help find Iris. She turns him down as she still blames Iris for what happened to Renee and takes her leave. After Thawne was defeated, Flash and Iris reunite Tinya with Renee after everything that was trapped in the Still Force was returned to their respectful locations.

Meena Dhawan / Fast Track

Meena Dhawan (portrayed by Kausar Mohammed; season 8) is the CEO of Fast Track Labs. She became a speedster by using the Biometric Lightning Oscillation Chamber (BLOC), which she invented alongside a time-displaced amnesiac Eobard Thawne, with whom she was romantically involved. She was recruited by Barry, who gives her the moniker "Fast Track" and mentors her. She briefly becomes corrupted by the Negative Speed Force and is distraught when the Negative Forces kill her lover by resurrecting the original Thawne in his body. After his defeat, the BLOC is depowered and Meena loses her speed. She is last seen preparing to depart; Iris gave her Eobard's yellow tie, noting that though she didn't meet this version, he was a "special person", to which Meena agreed and departed, but not before telling Barry and Iris that she will help Team Flash if necessary. In Season 9, Meena is mentioned as she appears in the flashback in "The Mask of the Red Death, Part 1".

Introduced in season nine

Ryan Wilder / Red Death

Ryan Wilder / Red Death (portrayed by Javicia Leslie) is an alternate timeline version of the current timeline's Ryan Wilder who was adopted by the Wayne family until they were killed by Joe Chill. She was left as Gotham City's sole protector since Batman doesn't exist in this timeline as well as a friend of her timeline's Iris. Flash opposed Ryan's plan where they ended up in a conflict which resulted in her Iris getting killed. Building a special suit that has an Artificial Speed Force, Ryan became Red Death. When trying to get into the Speed Force, Red Death was rejected and ended up in the current timeline in a vibrational form.

To be solidified, she allied herself with Captain Boomerang II, Fiddler II, Murmur II, and Chillblaine in order to steal specific items. Once solidified, Red Death proceeded to save her minions from Flash by using the Negative Speed Force to temporarily dampen his speed while making off with her minions and the engine needed to make a Cosmic Treadmill-type device. She also agreed to help Chillblaine revive Frost once her goal is complete. Her next plan involved recruiting Rainbow Raider in capturing Flash. Speaking from her remote-controlled armor, Red Death claims that she is not the latest avatar of the Negative Forces and reveals that her armor runs on the Artificial Speed Force. Then she posed as her alternate timeline self to obtain Iris so that Flash can run on it. After Chillblaine sabotaged the Cosmic Treadmill enough for it's energies to knock her out, Team Flash's Rogue Squad showed up. Chillblaine sacrifices himself to buy them time to get Flash and Iris away. With the Cosmic Treadmill destroyed, Red Death plans to take Flash's world as her way of "taking the war to him this time" which involved persuading Gorilla Grodd into helping her. Eventually, she was defeated by Flash, Grodd, and the current timeline's Batwoman. Flash mentions that Red Death has been remanded to A.R.G.U.S. custody where Batwoman's identity is kept safe.

Owen Mercer / Captain Boomerang II

Owen Mercer (portrayed by Richard Harmon) is the second villain with this title who throws special boomerangs made from Wayne Enterprises tech and can teleport who works for Red Death.

Andrea Wozzeck / Fiddler II

Andrea Wozzeck / Fiddler II (portrayed by Magda Apanowicz) is the second villain with this title who can also manipulate sound enough to place them in a high vibration state who works for Red Death. Her fiddle was made from Wayne Enterprises tech. At one point when she dueled Hotness, they found that they are mutual fans of Nine Inch Nails.

Guest stars
The following is a supplementary list of guest stars, some recurring, who appear in lesser roles. The characters are listed in order of appearance by the season in which they first appeared.

Introduced in season one
 Clyde Mardon (portrayed by Chad Rook) – A bank robber and murderer who was turned into a metahuman with the ability to control the weather of his surroundings. He is shot and killed by Joe West in the pilot episode.
 Simon Stagg (portrayed by William Sadler) – An industrialist and philanthropist who is fascinated with the Flash (Barry Allen) to the point of exploitation. He is killed by Eobard Thawne.
 Java (portrayed by Michasha Armstrong) – The head of security for Stagg Enterprises. Danton Black bribed him to gain access to Simon Stagg's house, but Java refused. In retaliation, Danton used his powers to kill him.
 Danton Black / Multiplex (portrayed by Michael Christopher Smith) – A scientist-turned-metahuman with an ability to duplicate himself. He falls out a window trying to attack the Flash after being defeated. When the Flash tries to pull him up, Multiplex lets himself fall to his death.
 Kyle Nimbus / Mist (portrayed by Anthony Carrigan) – A metahuman who can turn himself into a poisonous mist and is an enemy of Joe West. He was held in the S.T.A.R. Labs prison before being set free by Leonard Snart.
 Bette Sans Souci / Plastique (portrayed by Kelly Frye) – A former war veteran and metahuman with the ability to explode anything she touches. She is shot by General Wade Eiling and dies but her body turns into a bomb so Barry is forced to throw it into the ocean where it detonates safely away from the city.
 Tony Woodward / Girder (portrayed by Greg Finley) – A metahuman with the ability to turn his skin into steel. He bullied Barry Allen and Iris West when they were children. In season one, he kidnapped Iris to make himself famous only to be defeated by the Flash and remanded to the S.T.A.R. Labs pipeline. He was later killed by Farooq during Barry's temporary power loss. In season two when Harry Wells' used the particle accelerator to restore Barry's speed, Woodward was turned into a reanimated corpse before being defeated the Flash once more.
 Farooq Gibran / Blackout (portrayed by Michael Reventar) – A metahuman with the power to harness electricity. Farooq blamed Eobard Thawne for his friends' deaths after he accidentally killed them with his uncontrollable powers. He overloaded himself while trying to absorb the Flash's powers and died, with his body held in the S.T.A.R. Labs pipeline.
 William Tockman / Clock King (portrayed by Robert Knepper) – A master criminal. In season one of The Flash, Tockman took several civilians at CCPD hostage. Knepper reprises the role from Arrow.
 Roy Bivolo / Prism / Rainbow Raider (portrayed by Paul Anthony) – A metahuman with the ability to induce an uncontrollable rage in others. Bivolo infects and sends Barry Allen on a rage fit throughout the city which is only calmed by the Arrow, his team and S.T.A.R. Labs. After they defeat Bivolo, he was held in the particle accelerator prison before being set free by Leonard Snart. In season seven, it was mentioned by Kristen Kramer that Rainbow Raider has gone missing. In season nine, Rainbow Raider was recruited by Red Death and accompanied her in capturing Flash. His claim to siding with her is that Flash left him locked up in the S.T.A.R. Labs pipeline for nine months.
 Quentin Lance (portrayed by Paul Blackthorne) – A police captain in the Starling City Police Department. He helps Joe West and Cisco Ramon discover Earth-1 Harrison Wells's corpse, and Quentin and Joe become friends in the process due to their similarities as police detectives and fathers. Blackthorne stars as the character on Arrow.
 The Earth-2 version of the character (who is deceased) is mentioned by Black Siren in Arrow.
 Blackthorne also played the Earth-X version of the character in the "Crisis on Earth-X" crossover, a SS Sturmbannführer under Dark Arrow.
 Laurel Lance / Black Canary (portrayed by Katie Cassidy) – A Starling City assistant district attorney and vigilante. Cisco Ramon provides Laurel with an ultrasonic collar using components from both Sara Lance (Canary) and Hartley Rathaway's sonic weapons, improving Laurel's tactics with sonic weaponry. Cassidy stars as the character on Arrow.
 Cassidy also portrays the Earth-2 version of the character named Black Siren, a villainous metahuman and one of Zoom's lieutenants.
 Cassidy also portrays the Earth-X version of the character named Siren-X, the unrequited lover of Dark Arrow and a remnant of the Earth-X regime who comes to Earth-1 to avenge Dark Arrow. She kidnaps Fallout from an A.R.G.U.S. transport to cause him to explode. With Leo Snart's help, the Flash defeats Siren-X and prevents her victim's explosion.
 Lyla Michaels (portrayed by Audrey Marie Anderson) – An A.R.G.U.S. agent and John Diggle's wife. In season two, she travels to Central City to help Barry Allen track down King Shark after he escaped from A.R.G.U.S. custody. In season three, Lyla initially distrusted Barry after learning he altered her life while undoing the Flashpoint timeline, though she would later forgive him. After becoming the head of A.R.G.U.S. on Arrow, Lyla later assisted Team Flash by containing enemies S.T.A.R. Labs could not, such as Grodd, King Shark, and Bloodwork. During "Crisis on Infinite Earths," Lyla was turned into Harbinger after the Monitor recruited her to help him avert an impending crisis.
 Samantha Clayton (portrayed by Anna Hopkins) – The mother of Oliver Queen's unknown son William. She lives in Central City with her son after she lied to Oliver that she miscarried. Hopkins appears as the character on Arrow.
 Jason Rusch (portrayed by Luc Roderique) – A Hudson University graduate student and member of Martin Stein's research team on the F.I.R.E.S.T.O.R.M. project.
 Royal Flush Gang - A trio of bikers that are defeated by Flash.
 King (portrayed by an uncredited actor) - Member of the Royal Flush Gang.
 Queen (portrayed by an uncredited actor) - Member of the Royal Flush Gang.
 Ace (portrayed by an uncredited actor) - Member of the Royal Flush Gang.
 Shawna Baez / Peek-a-Boo (portrayed by Britne Oldford) – A metahuman with the ability to teleport. She was being held in the S.T.A.R. Labs prison before being set free by Leonard Snart. She briefly reappears in season four's premiere, where she is recaptured by Kid Flash and Vibe. Based on the DC Comics character Peek-a-Boo.
 Clarissa Stein (portrayed by Isabella Hofmann) – Martin Stein's wife.
 Anthony Bellows (portrayed by Vito D'Ambrosio) – A former police officer who became the Mayor of Central City. His corruption was later exposed by the Flash and Elongated Man and he was arrested by Joe West. Bellows is succeeded as mayor by Van Buren. While incarcerated at Iron Heights, he became a powerful figure where he gained lackeys and threatened David Ratchet. When Barry Allen is incarcerated at Iron Heights, he plays cards with Bellows and secretly uses speedster abilities to beat him in a card game.
 Dante Ramon (portrayed by Nicholas Gonzalez) – Cisco Ramon's older unambitious brother. Though they originally have a strained relationship due to their respective jealousies, they later try to reconcile their relationship. Barry resets the timeline to undo the Flashpoint timeline, resulting in Dante being killed by a drunk driver which threatened Cisco and Barry's relationship.
 Gonzalez also portrays the Earth-2 version of the character, Rupture, who wants revenge on Team Flash for killing Reverb, misled by Zoom to the circumstances of his brother's death. Rupture is ultimately killed by Zoom.
 Axel Walker / Trickster (portrayed by Devon Graye) – A young copycat of the original Trickster (James Jesse) who is his father.
 James Jesse / Trickster (portrayed by Mark Hamill) – A terrorist serving a life sentence in Iron Heights. Barry and Joe seek his aid to stop Axel Walker, a new Trickster emulating him. After his first defeat by the Flash, Jesse becomes obsessed with the speedster. Hamill reprises the role from the 1990 television series, later retroactively established that the James Jesse of Earth-90 and Earth-1 led near identical lives during that era. Based on the DC Comics character of the same name.
 Hamill also portrays the Earth-3 version of the character who is Jay Garrick's enemy.
 Brie Larvan (portrayed by Emily Kinney) – A female version of DC Comics character Bug-Eyed Bandit. She is a narcissistic technical genius and killer who becomes a rival to Felicity Smoak. She later appears as a member of the Young Rogues alongside Weather Witch and Rag Doll, with the three captured by Team Flash during a heist on McCulloch Technologies.
 Ray Palmer / Atom (portrayed by Brandon Routh) – A scientist, inventor and businessman who is the CEO of Palmer Technologies. He becomes friends with Cisco due to their shared fondness for advanced technologies. Routh recurs as the character on Arrow and is a regular on Legends of Tomorrow. In season eight, Ray Palmer visits Central City to attends Tech Con and had a rough start with Chester Runk. After assisting in the fight against Despero, Ray opens up the Quincy P. Runk Foundation. He later talks with Team Flash about their encounters with the time remnant version of Eobard Thawne.
 In the Reverse-Flashpoint timeline, Ray was mentioned to have been among the Legends killed by Damien Darhk and Reverse-Flash leading to Ryan Choi succeeding him.
 Routh also portrays the Superman of Earth-96, reprising the role from Superman Returns with elements of the Kingdom Come incarnation of the character.
 Hannibal Bates / Everyman (portrayed by Martin Novotny) – A metahuman with the ability to shapeshift, changing his appearance to resemble others. Owing to his powers, several other actors portrayed the character's various disguises (Chris Webb, Barbara Wallace, Laiken Laverock and Maxine Miller), including various series regulars. When Earth-Prime was formed, Barry listed Everyman as a suspect to Cecile about the imposter Iris when Vibe mentions that he is alive on Earth-Prime before having dismissed that theory.
 Tess Morgan (portrayed by Bre Blair) - The wife of Earth-1 Harrison Wells and another victim of Eobard Thawne.
 The Earth-2 version of the character (who is also deceased) is mentioned as the wife of Harry Wells and the mother of Jesse Quick.
 Jake Simmons / Deathbolt (portrayed by Doug Jones) – A metahuman with the ability to harness and weaponize plasma energy, reprising his role from Arrow. As Simmons was not in Central City when the particle accelerator exploded, he gained his powers through other means. He is killed by Leonard Snart in "Rogue Air" because Snart claimed "he owed me money."

Introduced in season two
 Albert Rothstein / Atom Smasher (portrayed by Adam Copeland) – A metahuman from Earth-2 with incredible strength and the ability to grow to an enormous size. He dies of radiation poisoning after battling the Flash, though not before he reveals he was sent by Zoom with promises to return home.
 Copeland also portrays the Earth-1 version of the character, a nuclear plant worker who was preemptively killed by Atom Smasher to fool Zoom in taking his identity.
 Eddie Slick / Sand Demon (portrayed by Kett Turton) – A metahuman from Earth-2 with the ability to transform his body into sand. He has had encounters with "the Flash" (Hunter Zolomon) on Earth-2 and is killed by the Flash (Barry Allen) on Earth-1. He is based on the DC Comics character of the same name.
 Turton also portrays the Earth-1 version of Slick, a career criminal and arsonist who never became a metahuman.
 Lewis Snart (portrayed by Michael Ironside) – A former police officer, career criminal, and the estranged abusive father of Leonard and Lisa Snart. He was killed by Leonard out of revenge.
 Henry Hewitt (portrayed by Demore Barnes) – A scientist who was affected by the particle accelerator explosion and a potential candidate to become Firestorm after Ronnie sacrificed himself. After being deemed unsuitable however, he acquired powers from the attempted merge and tried to kill Caitlin Snow and Jefferson Jackson, only to be defeated by the Flash and the new Firestorm before being remanded to the S.T.A.R. Labs pipeline.
 Barnes also portrays the Earth-2 version of Hewitt, a kindly human scientist at S.T.A.R. Labs who works under Harry Wells.
 Jefferson "Jax" Jackson / Firestorm (portrayed by Franz Drameh) – A former athlete who became injured and worked as an auto mechanic. He was chosen to replace Ronnie Raymond as Firestorm's other half with Martin Stein.
 Shay Lamden / King Shark (portrayed by Dan Payne as a human, voiced by David Hayter as King Shark) – A metahuman, anthropomorphic shark from Earth-2 sent by Zoom to kill the Flash. He was formerly a marine biologist who was mutated in an accident. The Earth-1 version of his wife, marine biologist Tanya Lamden, was brought in by A.R.G.U.S. to work on her late husband's counterpart; inventing a telepathy crown to communicate with him. King Shark was briefly restored to normal when the Flash used a metahuman cure on him. When Grodd escaped A.R.G.U.S., he stole the telepathy crown to attack Central City. However, Shay sacrificed his restored humanity to become King Shark once more and fight Grodd; with help from Flash and XS. He was quickly sent back to A.R.G.U.S.'s custody, under Tanya's care. Showrunner Andrew Kreisberg has stated that the character was originally introduced in The Flash: Season Zero comic because they would not have been able to create him for the series. He also added that in his initial appearance, it "was a very expensive 30 seconds of the show", and the producers did not think they could afford to do a whole episode with him, "so the idea was that he was one of Zoom's minions". 
 Vandal Savage / Hath-Set (portrayed by Casper Crump) – A 6,000-year-old immortal who had manipulated leaders throughout history in an attempt to gain dominion over the entire world.
 Malcolm Merlyn / Dark Archer (portrayed by John Barrowman) – The leader of the League of Assassins, archenemy of Oliver Queen, and the biological father of Thea Queen. Barrowman stars as the character on Arrow.
 Carter Hall / Khufu / Hawkman (portrayed by Falk Hentschel) – The latest reincarnation of an Egyptian prince who is fated to reincarnate throughout time along with his soulmate, Hawkgirl. He is based on the DC Comics character of the same name
 Thea Queen (portrayed by Willa Holland) – Oliver Queen's half-sister who began to operate as a vigilante, replacing Roy Harper as "Speedy". Holland stars as the character on Arrow.
 Damien Darhk (portrayed by Neal McDonough) – A former member of the League of Assassins and leader of his own clandestine group, H.I.V.E. McDonough appears as the character on Arrow.
 McDonough also portrays a Reverse-Flashpoint version of him. In this timeline, Damien Darhk was assisted by Reverse-Flash in slaying most of the Legends and Cisco Ramon. After being released from prison due to a technicality, Damien was in his penthouse when Barry approaches him for help. After using his Time Stone to see into Barry's true future as well as the fact that his daughter Nora is still alive there, Darhk agreed to help Barry. As Barry reaches the speeds needed to undo the Reverse-Flashpoint at the cost of the armageddon that Despero witnessed, Darhk coordinated him while fighting Frost and Chillblaine before being defeated by Ryan Choi and Sentinel. Darhk delayed his fading with the Time Stone. After Despero is defeated and Thawne is depowered, Darhk appears where he is briefly attacked by Mia for what happened to Laurel Lance. After a talk with Joe, Darhk gives him the Time Stone stating that it will come in handy some day. Darhk then fades away and Nora appears in his place.
 Russell Glosson / Turtle (portrayed by Aaron Douglas) – A metahuman who can slow down his surroundings by absorbing kinetic energy. Following his defeat by the Flash, he is killed by Harry Wells.
 Joey Monteleone / Tar Pit (portrayed by Marco Grazzini) – A metahuman with the ability to transform into molten asphalt.
 Floyd Lawton (portrayed by Michael Rowe) – A CCPD detective and partner of Iris West-Allen on Earth-2. He is not very adept at aiming and handling a gun, earning him the derogatory nickname, "Deadshot". Rowe previously appeared as the Earth-1 version of Lawton on Arrow.
 Adam Fells / Geomancer (portrayed by Adam Stafford) – A metahuman with the ability to create earthquakes.
 Scott Evans (portrayed by Tone Bell) – The editor of Central City Picture News following Eric Larkin's death and a love interest for Iris West.
 Tanya Lamden (portrayed by Haley Beauchamp in season two, Zibby Allen in season five) - A marine biologist and wife of the late Earth-1 Shay Lamden who Cisco and Caitlin ask about while locating his Earth-2 counterpart, King Shark. She was later brought in by A.R.G.U.S. to work on the aforementioned metahuman. As of season five, she invented a telepathy crown to communicate with him. When Barry, Caitlin, and Cisco visited her to test their metahuman cure on him, the telepathy crown was stolen by Grodd. After Shay sacrificed his humanity to help defeat Grodd, Tanya continued to care for him.
 Eliza Harmon / Trajectory (portrayed by Allison Paige) – An "exceptionally bright scientist with a split personality a la Jekyll and Hyde" from Mercury Labs. She helped Caitlin Snow with the Velocity 9 formula to try and restore Jay Garrick's lost speed. Even though Caitlin never gave her the full formula, Eliza managed to reverse engineer the drug and became addicted to it; manifesting an "evil" personality to justify her actions. Taking the name "Trajectory", she soon became a criminal speedster and causing havoc in Central City. After the Flash defeated her, she took a second dose despite already being on one and disintegrated. Her costume is subsequently recovered, modified, and given to Jesse Quick while her death causes Barry to realize "Jay Garrick" is actually Zoom.
 Griffin Grey (portrayed by Haig Sutherland) – A metahuman who gained super-strength as well as terminal Progeria as a side effect. He demanded a cure from Harry Wells, mistaking him for the Earth-1 Harrison Wells. During his fight with the Flash, Griffin died from the final stages of his metahuman side-effect, and regressed back to his original age.

Introduced in season three
 Edward Clariss / Rival (portrayed by Todd Lasance) – A black-suited speedster who was the archenemy of Kid Flash in the Flashpoint timeline. In the restored timeline, Alchemy restored Clariss' powers. As the Rival, he tried to kill Barry only to be defeated by him and later murdered by Savitar.
 Julio Mendez (portrayed by Alex Désert) – A CCPD captain in the Flashpoint timeline and a musician in the regular timeline. Désert reprises his role from the 1990 series of the same name.
 Frances "Frankie" Kane / Magenta (portrayed by Joey King) – A metahuman with magnetic abilities. She originally had powers in the Flashpoint timeline before Alchemy restored them in the regular timeline.
 Sam Scudder / Mirror Master (portrayed by Grey Damon) – A metahuman with the ability to travel through reflective surface, boyfriend of Rosa Dillon, and former member of Leonard Snart's gang before the particle accelerator explosion. In season seven, Mirror Master and Rosalind Dillon were revealed to be working with Black Hole. It was also revealed that Mirror Master was the original mirror creation of Eva McCulloch as she later shatters him upon his purpose being served.
 Rosalind "Rosa" Dillon / Top (portrayed by Ashley Rickards) – A metahuman and girlfriend of Sam Scudder with the ability to induce crippling vertigo via eye contact. She is based on the DC Comics character, Top. In season seven, Rosalind and Sam were revealed to be working with Black Hole. Eva swayed her to her side after shattering Sam who was revealed to be an original mirror creation. When interrogated by Cecile, Rosalind used an empathic move on her before admitting that Eva is going to bomb an airplane that has Black Hole items on it. In season eight, Cecile enlisted Rosalind to help locate Flash. She was badly wounded by Despero. She later visited Cecile when it turned out that she was siphoning her powers. This was proven when Joe arranges for Cecile and Rosalind to visit Mona Taylor at Iron Heights Penitentiary. She and Mona were present when Cecile rescued Psych and helped him to rescue the other force avatars. It was later mentioned that Rosalind has regained her powers sometime after Eobard Thawne's defeat.
 Shade (portrayed by Mike McLeod) – A metahuman who can vibrate his molecules to appear as a shadow.
 Judge Hankerson (portrayed by Ken Camroux-Taylor) – A Central City judge who has overseen the trials for Heat Monger, Barry Allen, Weather Witch, and Allegra Garcia. In season eight, it is mentioned that Judge Hankerson is retiring.
 Joanie (portrayed by Riley Jade Berglund) – The eldest daughter of Cecile Horton and the older maternal half-sister of Jenna West.
 Tom Patterson (portrayed by Greg Grunberg) – A detective based in Central City.
 Sara Lance / White Canary (portrayed by Caity Lotz) – The younger sister of Laurel Lance, Star City vigilante, former League of Assassins member, acting captain of the timeship Waverider, and leader of the Legends. The character is partially based on the Black Canary and was first introduced on Arrow. Lotz recurs as the character on Arrow and is a regular on Legends of Tomorrow.
 In "Crisis on Earth-X", Sara's Earth-X counterpart is said to have been killed by Sturmbannführer Quentin Lance after he discovered she was bisexual.
 In the Reverse-Flashpoint timeline, Sara was mentioned to have been among the Legends that were killed by Damien Darhk and Reverse-Flash.
 Lily Stein (portrayed by Christina Brucato) – The scientist daughter of Martin Stein.
  Jared Morillo / Plunder (portrayed by Stephen Huszar) – A jewel thief who uses futuristic technology.
 Clive Yorkin (portrayed by Matthew Kevin Anderson) – A metahuman who can disintegrate anything he touches. He originally had these powers in the Flashpoint timeline before Alchemy restored them in the new timeline.
 Eve Teschmacher (portrayed by Andrea Brooks) – James Olsen's assistant at CatCo Media on Earth-38. Brooks reprises her role from Supergirl.
 Solovar (voiced by Keith David) – A sentient albino gorilla and leader of Gorilla City on Earth-2. In season six, a mental manifestation of Solovar appeared as a gatekeeper preventing Barry and Grodd's minds from separating, forcing them to work together to defeat him. As of yet, the real Solovar's fate is unknown.
 Accelerated Man (portrayed by Sean Poague) – A Speed Force conduit and Earth-19's version of the Flash.
 Music Meister (portrayed by Darren Criss) – An extra-dimensional being with the ability to hypnotize people and send them into a self-created dream world. If his victim is a metahuman, he can also siphon their abilities.
 J'onn J'onzz / Martian Manhunter (portrayed by David Harewood) – An extraterrestrial superhero, the last Green Martian, and director of the Department of Extranormal Operations (DEO) who resides on Earth-38. Harewood reprises his role from Supergirl.
 Winslow "Winn" Schott, Jr. (portrayed by Jeremy Jordan) A friend of Supergirl and son of the criminal Toyman who works as a DEO desk agent on Earth-38. Jordan reprises his role from Supergirl.
 Jordan also portrays the Earth-X version, General Schott, leader of the resistance against the New Reich during the "Crisis on Earth-X" crossover.
 Mon-El (portrayed by Chris Wood) – An extraterrestrial prince from the planet Daxam with similar powers as Supergirl and her romantic partner from Earth-38. Wood reprises his role from Supergirl.
 Phillippe / Abra Kadabra (portrayed by David Dastmalchian) – A time-traveling criminal from a distant future whose advanced technological powers seem like magic. Sometime after the Crisis in season seven, Abra Kadaba returned to Flash's time with a plot to destroy Central City with an anti-matter bomb in light of the reset Multiverse erasing his family. Flash was able to talk him down where he mentioned that he lost Oliver Queen. When that worked, both of them were attacked by Fuerza which absorbs the blast of the anti-matter bomb and kills Abra Kadabra. Team Flash later stated that Abra Kadabra "died a hero".
 Lucious Coolidge / Heat Monger (portrayed by Richard Zeman) – An arsonist who operated in Central City while Heat Wave was "off the grid".

Introduced in season four
 Ramsey Deacon / Kilg%re (portrayed by Dominic Burgess) – A former computer programmer turned technopath after DeVoe turned him into a metahuman. DeVoe later killed him and stole his powers.
 Rebecca "Becky" Sharpe / Hazard (portrayed by Sugar Lyn Beard) – A metahuman created by DeVoe with the power to manipulate luck, giving herself good luck while jinxing everyone around her, before DeVoe stole her body and powers. In season nine, Becky's death was undone following the "Crisis on Infinite Earths" and she married Dominic Stewart. After that, she suffered from bad luck and found herself accused of placing Dominic in a coma. Cecile and Allegra found out that Dominic's brother Tony was responsible so that he can harness Becky's powers to help pay off his debts using a special device in the engagement ring that Tony previously gave her. Once Cecile got the ring off of Becky, she helps Cecile and Allegra defeat Tony and his minions.
 Weeper (portrayed by Matt Afonso) – A metahuman created by DeVoe whose tears induce psycho-active drug-like effects when ingested. He was originally Amunet Black's prisoner before he was captured by DeVoe and killed offscreen for his tears.
 Mina Chaytan (portrayed by Chelsea Kurtz) – A cultural anthropology professor who gained the ability to bring effigies to life after DeVoe turned her into a metahuman. DeVoe later killed her for her powers. She is inspired by the DC Comics villain Black Bison.
 David "Big Sir" Ratchet (portrayed by Bill Goldberg) – An inmate at Iron Heights Prison who Sylbert Rundine framed for the death of a Mercury Labs security guard. After Barry learns Rundine will not confess to the crime, Barry used his abilities to relocate David to Jaiju, China.
 Alex Danvers / Sentinel (portrayed by Chyler Leigh) – The adoptive sister of Kara Danvers and second-in-command of the DEO. Leigh reprises her role from Supergirl.
 Leigh also portrayed the Reverse-Flashpoint version of Sentinel. She was among the guests to the upcoming wedding of Eobard Thawne and Iris West. Alex does speak with Allegra and Chester about their failed relationship before aiding Atom II, Chillblaine, and Frost in defeating Damien Darhk.
 Ray Terrill / The Ray (portrayed by Russell Tovey) – A displaced hero from Earth-1 who chose to stay on Earth-X to fight the New Reich.
 Dinah Drake / Black Canary (portrayed by Juliana Harkavy) - A metahuman and former CCPD detective who joined Team Arrow as the new Black Canary. Harkavy reprises her role from Arrow.
 Dominic Lanse / Brainstorm (portrayed by Kendrick Sampson) – A metahuman who gained telepathic powers from DeVoe. He was originally in Amunet Black's custody before he was transferred to DeVoe, who killed him for his body and powers.
 Anton Slater (portrayed by Mark Valley) – Central City's district attorney who prosecuted Barry during his trial.
 Neil Borman / Fallout (portrayed by Ryan Alexander McDonald) – A truck driver gained radioactive abilities after DeVoe turned him into a metahuman. Despite being transferred to an A.R.G.U.S. facility, Borman was captured by DeVoe and used as a battery for his Enlightenment satellites; killing Borman in the process.
 Zoey Clark / Prank (portrayed by Corinne Bohrer) – James Jesse's partner-in-crime and mother of their son Axel Walker. Bohrer reprises her role from the 1990 television series of the same name.
 Beebo (voiced by Benjamin Diskin) – The Trickster and Prank were using a Beebo toy as a test subject by borrowing acid and melting the toy. Diskin reprises his role from Legends of Tomorrow.
 Josh / Breacher (portrayed by Danny Trejo) – A bounty hunter from Earth-19 and the father of Gypsy who possesses similar powers as his daughter and Cisco.
 Sylbert Rundine / Dwarfstar (portrayed by Derek Mears) – A metahuman who can shrink or enlarge any object after DeVoe gave him powers. He was later killed by DeVoe for his powers.
 Van Buren (portrayed by Kendall Cross) – The Mayor of Central City who succeeded Anthony Bellows. She resigned in season five following Spencer Young's arrest.
 Earl Cox (portrayed by Paul McGillion) – A friend of Ralph Dibny.
 Izzy Bowin (portrayed by Miranda MacDougall) – A female country and western fiddler who gained the ability to fire concussive soundwaves from her body after DeVoe turned her into a metahuman. She was later killed by DeVoe for her body and powers. She is inspired by the DC Comics villain Fiddler.
 Janet Petty / Null (portrayed by Bethany Brown) – A petty criminal who gained the ability to manipulate gravity after DeVoe turned her into a metahuman. She is later killed by DeVoe for her powers.
 Matthew Kim / Melting Point (portrayed by Leonardo Nam) – A metahuman who gained the ability to transfer other metahumans' abilities to another person from DeVoe. He was later killed by DeVoe for his powers.
 Eric Frye (portrayed by Oliver Rice) – A formerly pyrokinetic metahuman who lost his powers when Matthew Kim accidentally transferred them to Jaco Birch. Sometime after Earth-Prime is formed, Eric was mentioned to have pyrokinesis again when Cecile Horton represented him upon being accused of burning down a building.
 Jaco Birch / Hotness (portrayed by Max Adler) – A formerly ordinary man who received pyrokinetic powers when Matthew Kim accidentally transferred them to him from Eric Frye. He was defeated by Iris when she accidentally gained super-speed and was remanded to Iron Heights Penitentiary. Sometime after Earth-Prime was formed, Jaco still has his pyrokinetics, was released from prison on parole where he got a job as an arena security guard, and is a suspect in the incineration of Stan Mullen who he had an argument with the night before as well as Donna Winters. He was proven innocent when he wanted to be with his son Harold. In season nine, Hotness assists Team Flash in fighting Red Death and his minions. At one point during his duel with Fiddler II, it was revealed that Hotness and Fiddler II are mutual fans of Nine Inch Nails.
 Edwin Gauss / Folded Man (portrayed by Arturo Del Puerto) – A metahuman who gained the ability to create portals to pocket dimensions, or "folds", from DeVoe. He was later killed by DeVoe for his body and powers.

Jason Mewes and Kevin Smith cameo as Central City Museum security guards named Jay and Bob.

Introduced in season five
 William Lang / Gridlock (portrayed by Daniel Cudmore) – A kinetic energy-absorbing metahuman. After being defeated by Flash, Kid Flash, and XS, he was intercepted by Cicada, who used a meta-tech dagger to kill him.
 Vanessa Jansen / Block (portrayed by Erin Cummings) – A criminal who was betrayed by the East Street Skulls. After developing the ability to create box-shaped force-fields, she tried to take revenge on Bobby Moretti, one of the leaders before Flash and XS intervened and stopped them. Before she could be incarcerated, she was stabbed by Cicada. XS sped her body to the hospital only for Block to succumb to her wounds on the way there.
 Bruno Moretti (portrayed by Matty Finochio) – One of the leaders of the East Street Skulls street gang.
 Spencer Young (portrayed by Kiana Madeira) – A former journalist at Central City Picture News turned blogger and creator of the "Spyn Zone" app. Her smartphone was exposed to a fragment of DeVoe's Enlightenment satellite, which gave it the ability to control people's minds. She used her phone to endanger peoples' lives to increase her app popularity as well as brainwash XS before the Flash disarmed her and sent her to Iron Heights. She is inspired by the DC Comics villain Spin.
 Peter Merkel / Rag Doll (portrayed by Troy James, voiced by Phil LaMarr) – A criminal who was crushed by shrapnel from DeVoe's Enlightenment satellite, which gave him the ability to stretch and contort himself in a nightmarish manner. He stole or destroyed other peoples' most treasured items and kidnapped Barry Allen before being defeated by the Elongated Man and remanded to Iron Heights. He was later recruited by Nora West-Allen as part of her Young Rogues and by the criminal organization Black Hole to kill Joe West on two separate occasions, though he was defeated in both cases.
 Raelene Sharp (portrayed by Cassandra Ebner) – A metahuman with the ability to form blades from her arms. She was killed by Cicada as part of his vendetta.
 Del Toro (portrayed by Julianne Christie) - The warden of Iron Heights and successor of Gregory Wolfe who worked to undo the infamy surrounding Iron Heights.
 Joslyn "Joss" Jackam / Weather Witch (portrayed by Reina Hardesty) – The estranged daughter of Mark Mardon and niece of Clyde Mardon was fired from her meteorologist job after her weather experiments become too dangerous. A part of her van was struck with a fragment from DeVoe's Enlightenment satellite, which she turned into a staff that enabled her to control the weather like the Mardons. She attempted to exact revenge against her father, only to be defeated by the Flash using Mardon's weather control wand. She later escaped police custody with Silver Ghost's help before abandoning her in Bolivia and joining Nora West-Allen's Young Rogues, only to be captured by Team Flash during a heist on McCulloch Technologies.
 John Deegan (portrayed by Jeremy Davies) – A psychologist from Gotham City who was given the Book of Destiny by the Monitor to rewrite reality according to his whims.
 Clark Kent / Superman (portrayed by Tyler Hoechlin) – A reporter at the Daily Planet, defender of Metropolis, and cousin of Supergirl from Earth-38. Hoechlin reprises the role from Supergirl.
 Lois Lane (portrayed by Elizabeth Tulloch) – A reporter at the Daily Planet on Earth-38 and Superman's love interest.
 A.M.A.Z.O. – An android created by Ivo Laboratories on behalf of A.R.G.U.S. capable of mimicking the powers of every metahuman it scans. It was defeated by Superman, Supergirl, Oliver Queen as the Flash, and Barry Allen as Green Arrow.
 Raya Van Zandt / Silver Ghost (portrayed by Gabrielle Walsh) - A skilled ex-pilot with the call sign "Silver Ghost" and expert in vehicles who mysteriously obtained a meta-tech key fob that allows her to control vehicles. She helped Joss Jackam escape CCPD custody and persuaded her to help steal a WayneTech car in A.R.G.U.S.' possession. After XS tried to persuade her to change, Joss secretly thwarted Zandt's plans and escaped with her. She was later abandoned in Bolivia.
 Carl Bork (portrayed by Andre Tricoteux) - A metahuman criminal with super-strength and associate of Norvok's who was killed by Cicada.
 Goldface / Keith Kanyon (portrayed by Damion Poitier) - A metahuman criminal in the black market business who can turn his skin to gold and manipulate golden items. He is also the boyfriend of Blacksmith. In season eight, Goldface and his men were sent by Blacksmith to raid the Central City Police Department for the meta-bullets. He was defeated by Kristen Kramer. In season nine, Goldface was revealed to have gotten a reduced sentence after mentioning that Blacksmith was the one who ordered the raid on CCPD. He is among those who help Team Flash fight Red Death and her minions.
 Renee Adler (portrayed by Kimberly Williams-Paisley) - A librarian with telekinetic abilities who Sherloque falls in love with as part of Thawne's plan to take the detective off his and Nora's scent. She is also the Earth-1 version of his many ex-wives.
 Williams-Paisley also portrays four of Sherloque's five ex-wives, Adler's doppelgängers from four separate Earths. Though she is not seen, it is implied that the remaining one is another version of Adler from Earth-38.
 Philip Master / Acid Master (portrayed by John Gillich) - An acid-generating metahuman who fought Killer Frost before being sent to the S.T.A.R. Labs pipeline so that an older Grace as Cicada II couldn't kill him.
 Vickie Bolen (portrayed by Catherine Lough Haggquist) - An explosive metahuman who accidentally killed Grace Gibbons' parents. She was targeted by an older Grace as Cicada II before XS got her to safety.
 Alice Bolen (portrayed by Malia Baker) - The daughter of Vickie and John Bolen.
 John Bolen (portrayed by Chris Shields) - The husband of Vickie Bolen who was targeted by Cicada II before Flash rescued him.
 August Heart / Godspeed (portrayed by Kindall Charters in season five, Karan Oberoi in season seven, voiced by BD Wong) - A Mercury Labs intern who becomes a speedster in 2049 after replicating Zoom's Velocity-9 drug. He sought to create a new version of the drug that would make his powers permanent, but was thwarted by Nora West-Allen and incarcerated. In season six, Heart mysteriously turned up in 2019 and sent out a series of imposter drones to attack Central City and steal Barry's speed. Initially, despite catching his proxies, Team Flash has yet to locate Heart himself, though they learned that he had aligned himself with a group who wants infinite velocity. In season seven, the Godspeed Drones are fighting among each other to see who will get to Godspeed first according to a Godspeed Drone that Flash and John Diggle briefly caught. Cecile and Diggle were able to find Heart who has amnesia. After his memory was restored upon Flash giving him organic speed, Godspeed withdrew his clones and fought Flash even when Eobard Thawne was restored. Godspeed was stabbed by an energy bolt by Thawne, yet survived and was remanded to Iron Heights with his memory of Flash's identity being removed.

Introduced in season six
 Godspeed Drone #4 (portrayed by Ryan Handley) – The fourth in a series of Godspeed drones that Flash defeated in the four-month gap between seasons 5 and 6 and can only speak "modem." He and the other drones were drained of their speed by a fifth drone.
 Rachel Rosso (portrayed by Meera Simhan) – A doctor and the mother of Ramsey Rosso who helped Caitlin Snow become a doctor herself. When she came down with HLH, she chose to accept her fate. However, her son saw this as a betrayal and grew angry with her; believing she was giving up when she should have been fighting back.
 Mitch Romero (portrayed by Shawn Stuart) – An arms dealer who Ramsey Rosso tries to buy a dark matter-based gun from, only to be killed by the doctor's powers. While Rosso tries to examine what happened to him, Romero becomes a zombie-like creature and attacks him. Following said attack, he attacks and kills his own crew to steal dark matter and strengthen himself before attacking S.T.A.R. Labs. Barry and Killer Frost overdose him on dark matter and destroy him.
 Remington Meister (portrayed by Carlo Rota) – A German crime lord who held an auction for a weaponized satellite in Midway City before he was foiled and arrested by Barry Allen and Ralph Dibny.
 Joan Williams (portrayed by Michelle Harrison) - A scientist on Earth-3 who is married to Jay Garrick and resembles Nora Allen. In season seven sometime after the Crisis, Joan is living on Earth-Prime in Keystone City. After helping Jay regain his super-speed, Joan hears about the Godspeed Drones attacking Central City. Before going to tend to the patient, Joan advises Jay to be careful. Following Godspeed's defeat, Joan was present when Barry and Iris renew their vows.
 Lex Luthor (portrayed by Jon Cryer) – An enemy of Superman and Supergirl's from Earth-38 that the Monitor recruited to avert the Crisis. Cryer reprises his role from Supergirl.
 Jim Corrigan (portrayed by Stephen Lobo) – A police officer from an unspecified Earth who housed the Spectre before passing its power onto Oliver Queen so he could save the multiverse.
 Ryan Choi (portrayed by Osric Chau) – An Ivy Town University scientist, fan of Ray Palmer, and miniaturization expert who was recruited to help avert a multiverse-destroying Crisis. Before making his first physical appearance, Choi was previously mentioned in season 5 when Nora West-Allen states he was the one who developed Barry's Flash Ring suit.
 Chau also portrays the Reverse-Flashpoint version of Choi. He has succeeded Ray as the Atom ever since Ray was among those killed in battle against Damien Darhk and Reverse-Flash.
 Kate Kane / Batwoman (portrayed by Ruby Rose) – The cousin of Bruce Wayne who took over Wayne Enterprises and his crime-fighting duties after he mysteriously disappeared. Rose reprises her role from Batwoman.
 Mia Smoak / Green Arrow (portrayed by Katherine McNamara) – The daughter of Green Arrow who the Monitor brought from the year 2040 to help avert the Crisis. In season eight, Mia arrives in 2021 looking for William as she tracks down Thawne instead. She mentioned to Iris about her mission and suggested that she speaks with Felicity. Mia is briefly mind-controlled by Despero to finish off a fading Thawne. After Despero is defeated and Thawne is depowerd, Mia holds back her attack on Damien Darhk for what she did to Laurel Lance. Then she takes Iris' advice to speak to Felicity. McNamara reprises her role from Arrow.
 John Constantine (portrayed by Matt Ryan) – An enigmatic and irreverent former con man turned reluctant supernatural detective and Legends member. Ryan reprises his role from Constantine and Legends of Tomorrow.
 Helena Kyle / Huntress (portrayed by Ashley Scott) – A half-metahuman superheroine from Earth-203 and the daughter of her world's Batman and Catwoman. Scott reprises her role from Birds of Prey.
 Lucifer Morningstar (portrayed by Tom Ellis) – The Lord of Hell who retired to become a nightclub owner and consultant to the LAPD on Earth-666. He helped Constantine's group get into Purgatory. Ellis reprises his role from Lucifer.
 Jefferson Pierce / Black Lightning (portrayed by Cress Williams) – A teacher with electrical powers from an unspecified Earth that Barry and his allies recruited to help them avert the crisis. In season eight, Black Lightning helped Barry in trying to avert the armageddon that Despero foresaw and gave him some advice on what it means to be a hero. He did buy Deon Owens time to send Barry to 2030. Williams reprises his role from Black Lightning.
 Black Hole - A secret organization specializing in unique tech and assassins with light-based abilities.
 Joseph Carver (portrayed by Eric Nenninger) – The CEO of McCulloch Technologies and husband of Eva McCulloch who used his wife's technology for criminal means out of a belief that he was saving the world. Though he encountered resistance from Team Flash and CCPD, he was eventually killed by Eva.
 Dr. Kimiyo Hoshi / Doctor Light (portrayed by Emmie Nagata) – A Black Hole assassin armed with a UV gun. Carver tasked her with killing Iris West when she interfered with Black Hole's operations before being calling her off. She was later swayed to Eva's side and became her bodyguard. In season eight, Doctor Light and Sunshine took control over the Arañas and started targeting ex-member Lydia Sanchez. Both of them were repelled by Allegra Garcia while the rest of CCC Media broadcast Lydia's information about the Arañas causing them to retreat. Daisy Korber informed Allegra that there are currently being hunted down by the authorities.
 Millie Rawlins / Sunshine (portrayed by Natalie Sharp) - A ex-military special ops operative with the Department of Defense's covert division who went by the call sign "Sunshine". After she gained light-bending abilities from the particle accelerator, Sunshine became an operative of Black Hole. She was charged with stealing the prismatic refractor from Mercury Labs, only to defeated by Barry Allen and CCPD, who exploited her weakness of being solar powered. She was later freed from police custody by Rag Doll and later swayed to Eva's side where she was provided special bracelets to help her maintain her abilities at night. In season eight, Doctor Light and Sunshine took control over the Arañas and started targeting ex-member Lydia Sanchez. Both of them were repelled by Allegra Garcia while the rest of CCC Media broadcast Lydia's information about the Arañas causing them to retreat. Daisy Korber informed Allegra that there are currently being hunted down by the authorities.
 Maurice (portrayed by Andrew J. Hampton) - Joseph Carver's personal assistant.
 Gene Huskk (portrayed by William MacDonald) – An informant for Iris with information on Black Hole. He formerly worked for McCulloch Technologies before he was fired and later killed by Doctor Light.
 John Loring (portrayed by Silver Kim) - A criminal that Sue Dearbon targeted for a diamond that she wanted. He is named after DC Comics character Jean Loring.
 Frida Novikov / Turtle II (portrayed by Vanessa Walsh) - A chronokinetic metahuman who can create time bubbles. While planning her revenge for a failed crime spree, she is defeated by Flash, Kid Flash, and Joe West using a Velocity-X formula to negate her powers before Joe arrested her.
 Roderick Smith (portrayed by Joel Semande) - Hartley Rathaway's right-hand man and boyfriend in the post-Crisis timeline.
 Penelope Dearbon (portrayed by Nancy Hillis) - The mother of Sue Dearbon who is a known socialite. She was among the people that were replaced by Mirror Eva McCulloch's mirror duplicates before they were released from the Mirrorverse when Eva's plan was thwarted and the duplicates were destroyed. In season eight, it was mentioned that Penelope was arrested for her involvement with Black Hole.
 Richard Dearbon (portrayed by Mark Brandon) - The father of Sue Dearbon. He was among the people that were replaced by Mirror Eva McCulloch's mirror duplicates before they were released from the Mirrorverse when Eva's plan was thwarted and the duplicates were destroyed. In season eight, it was mentioned that Richard was arrested for his involvement with Black Hole.

Dina Meyer makes an uncredited vocal cameo in "Crisis on Infinite Earths: Part Three"; reprising her role as Barbara Gordon / Oracle from Birds of Prey.

Introduced in season seven
 Arielle Atkins (portrayed by Jessica Hayles) - The host of The Arielle Atkines Hour. Cisco once nicknamed her "Rachel Maddow 2.0".
 Quincy P. Runk (portrayed by Milton Barnes) - An inventor and the father of Chester who died in a car accident during the 90's.
 Chip Cooper (portrayed by Donny Lucas) - An A.R.G.U.S. agent who Kramer procures a copy of the meta-human cure from.
 Judge Tanaka (portrayed by Donna Soares) - A judge oversaw the trial of Frost.
 Councillor Strong (portrayed by Deb Podowski) - A councillor who prosecuted Frost. In season eight, Strong is among the people that Iris interviewed in her podcast following Frost's sacrificed. She mentioned that Frost forgave her for prosecuting her enough that Strong started defending metas.
 Carrie Bates / Rainbow Raider 2.0 (portrayed by Jona Xiao) - A metahuman and former collections officer whose rainbow abilities put anyone in a euphoric state. She used her powers to give money to the less fortunate. When it came to a hijacked blimp from Ferris Aircraft heading to a football game, Allegra helped to subdue Carrie as Flash advised her to abandon her idea. The district attorney was able to get Carrie some community service working on Mayor Sampson's economic development committee.
 Dr. Olsen (portrayed by Jonathon Young) - A doctor who worked for Black Hole. He was responsible for experimenting on Ultraviolet and even removed her vocal cords. Following Joseph Carver's death, Dr. Olsen continued his human experiments and sold them to the highest bidder which led him to be targeted by Ultraviolet. When Ultraviolet finds where Dr. Olsen was hiding, he offered to give Ultraviolet her vocal cords back if she takes down everyone who knows about the true nature of his work. During Ultraviolet's fight with Allegra, Dr. Olsen and Ultraviolet were knocked down by Allegra's new ability. Sue and Frost later mentioned to Allegra that Dr. Olsen has been remanded to Iron Heights.
 Prisoner Godspeed Drone (voiced by Rick D. Wasserman) - A Godspeed Drone that Flash caught with John Diggle's Entropy Trap. It was the one who told Flash about a civil war between the Godspeed Drones to see who will get to August Heart first and kill him. As Flash would not allow it, the Godspeed Drone broke free, destroyed the Entropy Trap, and escaped. The same Godspeed Drone later partook in targeting Bart Allen which involved capturing Jay Garrick.
 Adam Creyke (portrayed by Julian Black Antelope) - A metahuman of Wet'suwet'en descent who is a former United States Army soldier and childhood friend of Kristen Kramer that possesses invulnerability. He was responsible for selling out Kristen's military unit to an enemy side. Sometime later, Kramer and Joe West were able to track down Adam, apprehend him, and hand him over to the military.

Introduced in season eight
 Taylor Downs (portrayed by Rachel Drance) - A reporter for the Central City Citizen Media who starts to develop a rivalry with Allegra. This lasted until Allegra revealed her abilities during the attack from Doctor Light and Sunshine.
 Vanya (portrayed by Lindy Booth) - A reporter for the Central City Citizen Media.
 Aariz (porterayed by Shayan Bayat) - A reporter for the Central City Citizen Media.
 Royal Flush Gang - This incarnation consists of metahumans. They caused a train accident that was thwarted by Flash rescuing everyone on board, stole a specific microchip, and caused a prison break at Iron Heights Penitentiary so that they can obtain the services of Jared Haywood. Flash's super-thinking thwarted the Royal Flush Gang before they can rob the casinos and handed them over to the police. At the time when Nora and Bart visited December 31, 2013 to investigate the time anomaly that erased Joan Garrick, Mona overheard Nora and Bart talking and learned the term 'metahuman" which led to her finding similar metahumans to form the Royal Flush Gang. While Nora and Bart were able to let the Royal Flush Gang commit the heist, Nora was able to dispose of the bombs to lessen the casualties.
 Mona Taylor / Queen (portrayed by Agam Darshi) - The leader of the Royal Flush Gang with psychic abilities. When Rosalind Dillon helped Cecile discover that she has psychic-siphoning abilities, Joe arranged for Cecile and Rosalind to speak with Mona at Iron Heights Penitentiary where the same ability worked on Queen. She was present when Cecile rescued Psych. After Thawne was defeated, it was mentioned that Mona regained her abilities and was returned to Iron Heights Penitentiary.
 King (portrayed by Ryan Jefferson Booth) - A member of the Royal Flush Gang that has super-strength.
 Jake Foh / Jack (portrayed by Eston Fung) - A member of the Royal Flush Gang who shoots lasers out of his eyes.
 Wanda Wayland / Ten (portrayed by Megan Peta Hill) - A member of the Royal Flush Gang with super-agility who is also an expert at hand-to-hand combat.
 Jared Haywood (portrayed by Shaun Omaid) - An espionage hacker at Iron Heights Penitentiary who was sprung out by the Royal Flush Gang during a prison break to help them get into the casino computers. Before they can dispose of him after he served their purpose, Flash rescued him and returned him to Iron Heights Penitentiary.
 Marcus Ficus (portrayed by Andres Soto) - A botanist who becomes Caitlin's boyfriend.
 Xotar (portrayed by Kandyse McClure) - A metahuman with mind-control and telekinesis from National City who brainwashed people into helping out with her heists. After being knocked down by Flash's lightning attacks, Xotar was placed in power-dampening cuffs and handed over to the police.
 Ryan Wilder / Batwoman II (portrayed by Javicia Leslie) - The new Batwoman of Gotham City after the disappearance of Kate Kane. Some time before season 9, Ryan disappeared during a patrol a few weeks early. But she eventually returned and helped the Flash defeat the Red Death in Central City.
 In the Reverse-Flashpoint timeline, she is married to Sophie Moore and attends Eobard and Iris' wedding representation. Leslie reprises her role from Batwoman.
 Nora Darhk (portrayed by Courtney Ford) - The daughter of Damien Darhk and wife of Ray Palmer. In the Reverse-Flashpoint timeline, Nora was mentioned to have died at some point. After Damien gives his Time Stone to Joe West, he fades away and Nora appears in his place as Joe states that he has a lot to tell her. Ford reprises her role from Legends of Tomorrow.
 Avery (portrayed by Piper Curda) - A scientist at Fast Track Labs who is studying temporal dynamics at the time when Nora and Bart time-travel to December 31, 2013. To thwart the Royal Flush Gang's plan to kill people with their bombs, Nora and Bart had to reveal to her that they came from the future to find a way to lessen the casualties.
 Stan Mullen (portrayed by Jag Bal) - The manager of O'Shaughnessy's who got into an argument with Jaco Birch over the payment of the backstage passes for a L.I.P.S. concert. He was found incinerated with Jaco being a suspect. The real culprit turned out to be Deathstorm.
 Donna Winters (portrayed by Lauren Jackson) - A bartender at O'Shaughnessy's. She was later found incincerated by Flash and Frost after mentioning to the police that Stan and Jaco were in an argument. The real culprit turned out to be Deathstorm.
 Harold Birch (portrayed by Nicholas Elia) - The son of Jaco Birch. When Jaco was suspected of murdering Stan Mullen, Jaco was placed in the custody of social services. It was mentioned in dialogue between Jaco and Cecile that Harold's mother has been in and out of Harold's life while barely taking care of him.
 Rosie Levin (portrayed by Tavia Cervi) - A social media influencer that was interviewed by Allegra and Taylor upon being named Central City Citizen of the Week.
 Lydia Sanchez (portrayed by Kaitlyn Santa Juana) - A former inmate of Iron Heights and former member of the Arañas that Allegra meets up with during the interview with Rosie Levin. She later took on Allegra's offer be interviewed about the Arañas when its latest leaders Doctor Light and Sunshine targeted her. Allegra bought the CCC Media staff time to do the interview that exposes the Arañas enough for Doctor Light and Sunshine to retreat.
 Renee Wizzo (portrayed by Meghan Gardiner) - The mother of Tinya who gave birth to her when she was 16 and regretably put her up for adoption. Years later, Iris and Sue reunited Tinya with Renee. Due to Iris' time sickness, she accidentally caused Renee to disappear. This caused Renee to end up lost in the Still Force. She would later be freed when the Negative Fources are defeated.
 Mark Desmond / Blockbuster - A criminal who stole an experimental exosuit from Ivo Laboratories. Because of the grief following Frost's sacrifice, Team Flash had a hard time fighting Blockbuster. Following Frost's funeral, Team Flash defeated Blockbuster offscreen.

Introduced in season nine
 Michelle Amar / Murmur (portrayed by Alexandria Wailes) - Described as an "angry med student turned serial killer", Murmur is a masked villain with a stitched mouth who wields a special knife made from Wayne Enterprises tech who works for Red Death. She speaks through sign language which the other characters understand.
 Dominic Stewart (portrayed by Drew Henderson) - The fiancé of Becky Sharpe who was placed in a coma by his brother's minions. He would later awaken from a coma following Becky's good luck abilities returning.
 Tony Stewart (portrayed by Andrew Francis) - The brother of Dominic Stewart who gave Becky an engagement ring with a special diamond in it that would cause her to have bad luck while everyone else has good luck. He used her to help pay off his debts. Once Cecile and Allegra got the ring off during a brief blackout caused by Chester, Becky helps them defeat Tony and his minions. After that, Cecile has Chester call Kristen Kramer to have Tony and his minions arrested.

See also
 List of Arrow characters
 List of Legends of Tomorrow characters
 List of Arrowverse actors
 List of Supergirl characters
 List of Black Lightning characters
 List of Batwoman characters

Notes

References

Lists of action television characters
Flash, The
Lists of drama television characters
Lists of science fiction television characters